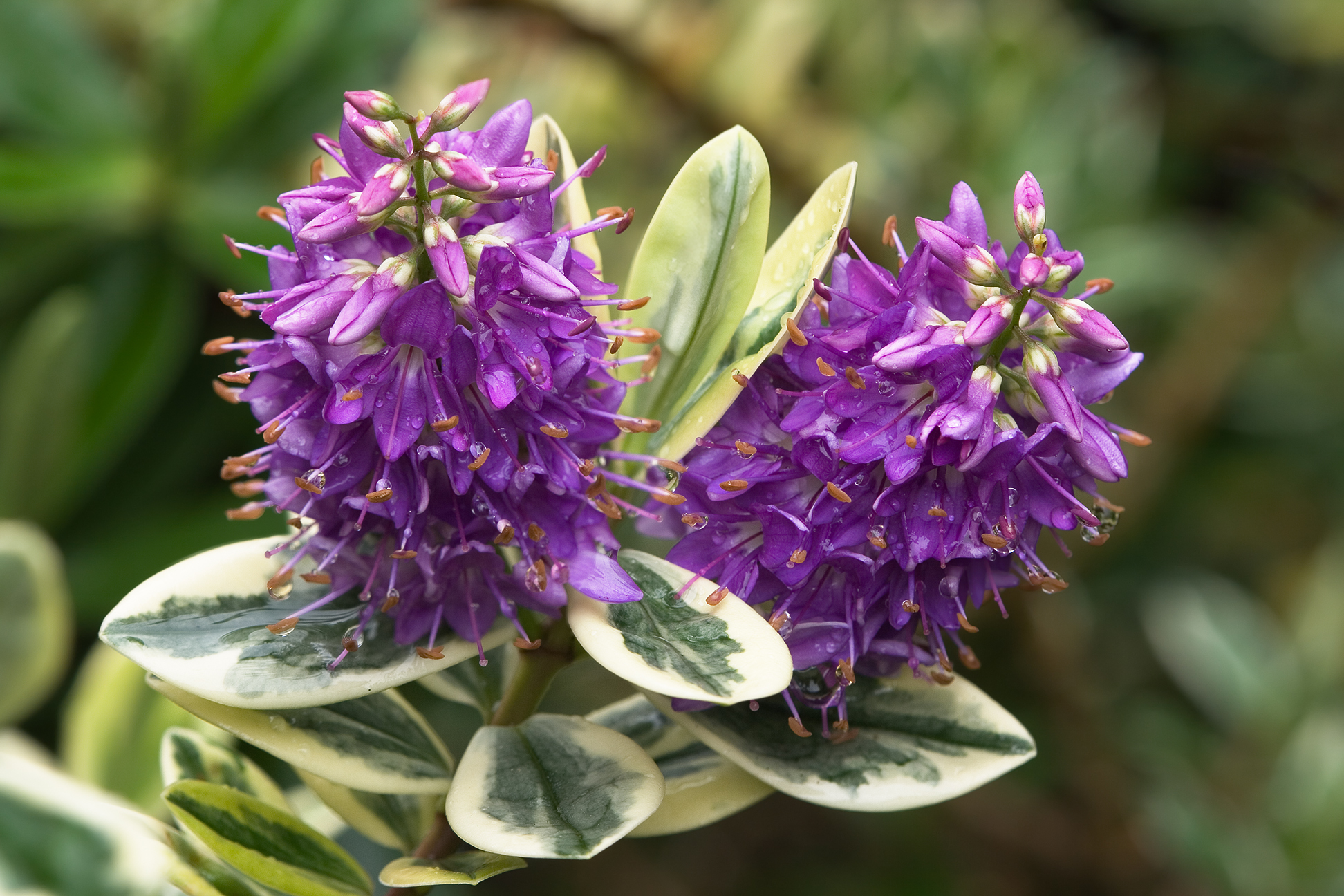
- Veronica 'Waireka'

Scientific classification
- Kingdom: Plantae
- Clade: Tracheophytes
- Clade: Angiosperms
- Clade: Eudicots
- Clade: Asterids
- Order: Lamiales
- Family: Plantaginaceae
- Genus: Veronica
- Subgenus: Veronica subg. Pseudoveronica
- Section: Veronica sect. Hebe (Juss.) G.Don

Species
- See text.

= Veronica sect. Hebe =

Genus of flowering plants

Veronica sect. Hebe is a group of plants within the genus Veronica, native to New Zealand, Rapa in French Polynesia, the Falkland Islands and South America. It was formerly treated as the separate genus Hebe (/ˈhiːbiː/). It includes about 90 species. Almost all species occur in New Zealand, apart from Veronica rapensis (endemic to Rapa) and Veronica salicifolia, found in South America. It is named after the Greek goddess of youth, Hebe. Informally, species in the section may be called shrubby veronicas or hebes.

Hebes are widely grown as ornamental plants (see Cultivation below).

== Description ==
Species in Veronica sect. Hebe have four perpendicular rows of leaves in opposite decussate pairs. The flowers are perfect, the corolla usually has four slightly unequal lobes, the flower has two stamens and a long style. Flowers are arranged in a spiked inflorescence. Identification of species is difficult, especially if they are not in flower. The plants range in size from dwarf shrubs to small trees up to 7 metres (23 feet), and are distributed from coastal to alpine ecosystems. Large-leaved species are normally found on the coast, in lowland scrub and along forest margins. At higher altitudes smaller-leaved species grow, and in alpine areas there are whipcord species with leaves reduced to thick scales.

== Taxonomy ==
There are differing classifications for the genus. The former genus Hebe, together with the related Australasian genera Chionohebe, Derwentia, Detzneria, Parahebe, Heliohebe and Leonohebe are now included in the larger genus Veronica (hence the common name shrubby veronicas).

== Species ==
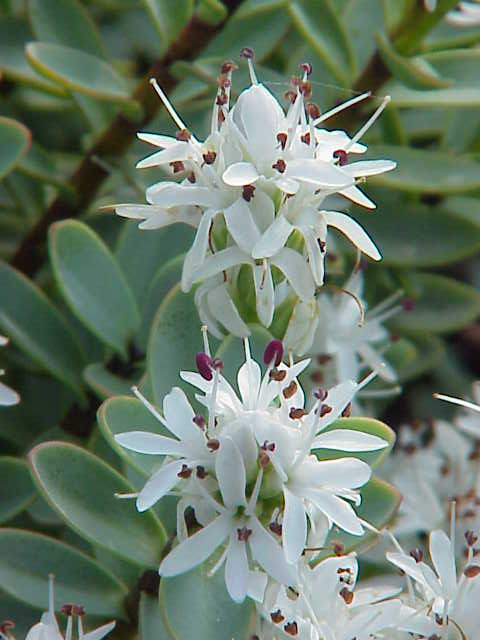
Veronica pinguifolia

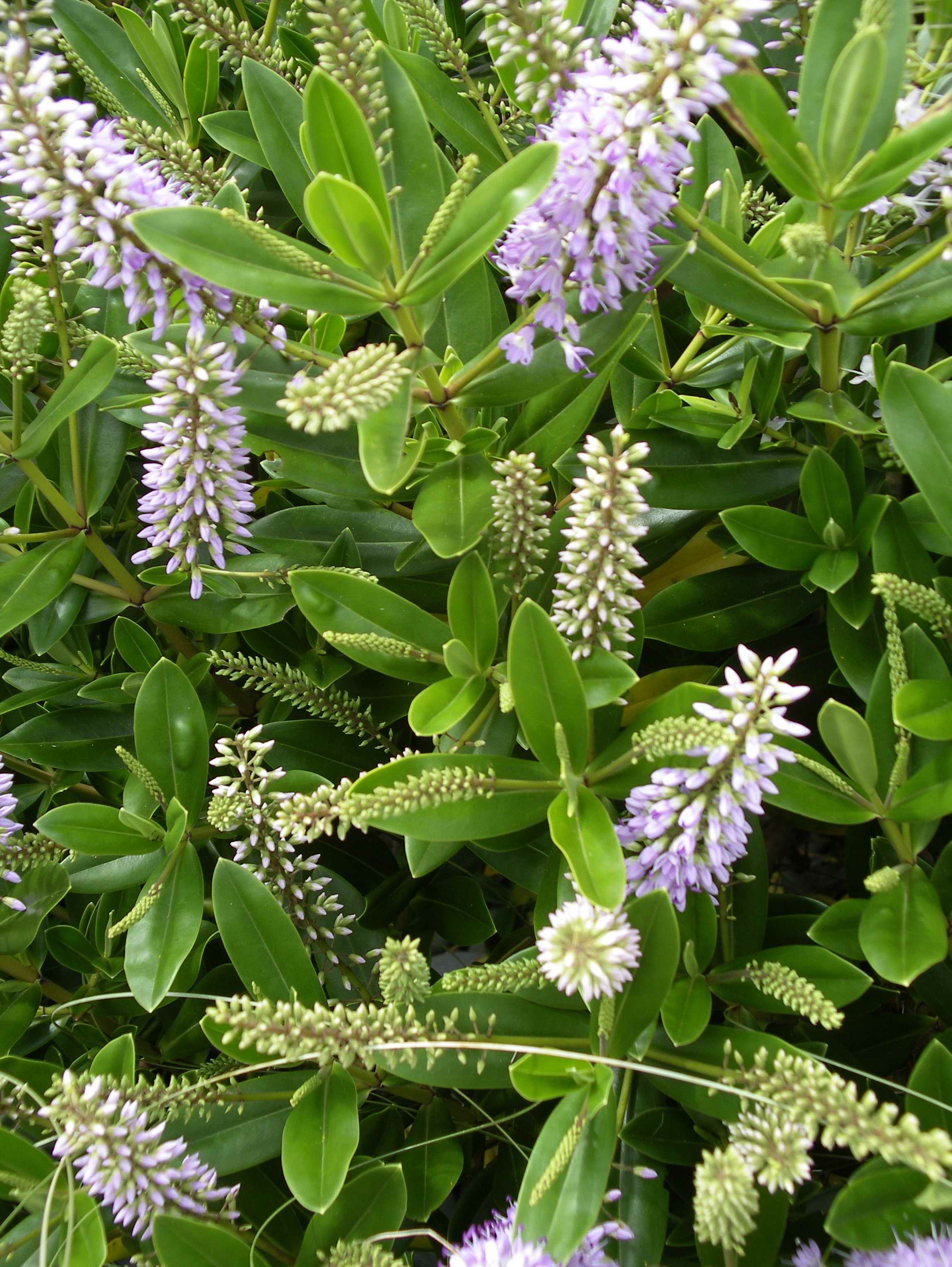
Veronica speciosa

About 90–100 species were formerly placed in Hebe and have been moved to Veronica, including:

- Hebe acutiflora → Veronica rivalis
- Hebe albicans → Veronica albicans
- Hebe amplexicaulis → Veronica amplexicaulis
- Hebe arganthera → Veronica arganthera
- Hebe armstrongii → Veronica armstrongii
- Hebe barkeri → Veronica barkeri
- Hebe bishopiana → Veronica bishopiana
- Hebe brachysiphon → Veronica brachysiphon
- Hebe breviracemosa → Veronica breviracemosa
- Hebe brevifolia → Veronica punicea
- Hebe buchananii → Veronica buchananii
- Hebe canterburiensis → Veronica canterburiensis
- Hebe carnosula → Veronica baylyi
- Hebe chathamica → Veronica chathamica
- Hebe cheesmannii → Veronica quadrifaria
- Hebe ciliolata → Veronica ciliolata
- Hebe colensoi → Veronica colensoi
- Hebe cupressoides → Veronica cupressoides
- Hebe decumbens → Veronica decumbens
- Hebe dieffenbachii → Veronica dieffenbachii
- Hebe diosmifolia → Veronica diosmifolia
- Hebe elliptica → Veronica elliptica
- Hebe epacridea → Veronica epacridea
- Hebe gibbsii → Veronica gibbsii
- Hebe glaucophylla → Veronica glaucophylla
- Hebe gracillima → Veronica leiophylla
- Hebe haastii → Veronica haastii
- Hebe hectorii → Veronica hectorii
- Hebe hulkeana → Veronica hulkeana
- Hebe lavaudiana → Veronica lavaudiana
- Hebe leiophylla → Veronica leiophylla
- Hebe ligustrifolia → Veronica ligustrifolia
- Hebe lycopodioides → Veronica lycopodioides
- Hebe macrantha → Veronica macrantha
- Hebe matthewsii → Veronica matthewsii
- Hebe obtusata → Veronica obtusata
- Hebe ochracea → Veronica ochracea
- Hebe odora → Veronica odora
- Hebe parviflora → Veronica parviflora
- Hebe pauciramosa → Veronica pauciramosa
- Hebe pauciramosa var. masoniae → Veronica masoniae
- Hebe pimeleoides → Veronica pimeleoides
- Hebe pinguifolia → Veronica pinguifolia
- Hebe propinqua → Veronica propinqua
- Hebe rakaiensis → Veronica rakaiensis
- Hebe raoulii → Veronica raoulii
- Hebe recurva was an unplaced name in Plants of the World Online, as of October 2022; see Veronica recurva
- Hebe salicifolia → Veronica salicifolia
- Hebe salicornioides → Veronica salicornioides
- Hebe speciosa → Veronica speciosa
- Hebe stricta → Veronica stricta
- Hebe subalpina → Veronica subalpina
- Hebe subsimilis → Veronica tetragona subsp. subsimilis
- Hebe tetragona → Veronica tetragona
- Hebe tetrasticha → Veronica tetrasticha
- Hebe topiaria → Veronica topiaria
- Hebe traversii → Veronica traversii
- Hebe trisepala → Veronica diosmifolia
- Hebe venustula → Veronica venustula
- Hebe vernicosa → Veronica vernicosa

== Cultivation ==
Hebes are valued in gardens in temperate climates as evergreen shrubs with decorative (sometimes variegated) leaves. The flowers, in shades of blue, purple, pink or white, appear throughout summer and autumn. Their ability to withstand salt-laden winds makes them especially suited to coastal areas, for instance the South West of England, where they are often grown as hedges. Prostrate varieties can be used as groundcover.

Hebes cope with most soil types, and can be propagated easily from both seed and cuttings. Wild hybrids in section Hebe are uncommon; however, there are many cultivated hybrids, such as Veronica × franciscana.

The Hebe Society, formed in 1985 under the auspices of the British Royal Horticultural Society, promotes the cultivation and conservation of hebes and other New Zealand native plants.

=== AGM cultivars ===
The following cultivars have gained the Royal Horticultural Society's Award of Garden Merit:

- V. albicans (white, 1m)
- 'Blue Clouds' (pale blue, 1m)
- ’Caledonia’ (violet, 1m)
- 'Emerald Gem' (white, 0.3m)
- 'Great Orme' (pink/white, 1.2m)
- V. macrantha
- 'Margret' (light blue, 0.5m)
- 'Midsummer Beauty' (lilac/white, 2.5m)
- 'Mrs Winder' (violet-blue, 1m)
- 'Neil's Choice' (violet, 1.2m)
- 'Nicola's Blush' (pink/white, 1m)
- H. ochracea 'James Stirling' (white, 0.5m)
- 'Oratia Beauty' (pink/white, 0.75m)
- 'Pascal' (violet-blue, 0.5m)
- 'Pewter Dome' (white, 05m)
- V. pimeloides 'Quicksilver' (pale violet, 0.5m)
- V. pinguifolia 'Pagei' (white, 0.3m)
- 'Pink Elephant' (white, 0.5m)
- V. rakaiensis (white, 1m)
- V. recurva 'Boughton Silver' (white, 1m)
- 'Red Edge' (mauve/white, 0.5m)
- 'Sapphire' (mauve, 1.5m)
- 'Silver Queen' (mauve, 1m)
- V. topiaria (white, 0.5m)
- V. vernicosa (white, 0.5m)
- ’Wingletye’ (mauve, 0.5m)
- 'Wiri Dawn' (pale pink, 0.5m)
- 'Youngii' (violet/white, 0.2m)

== Gallery ==
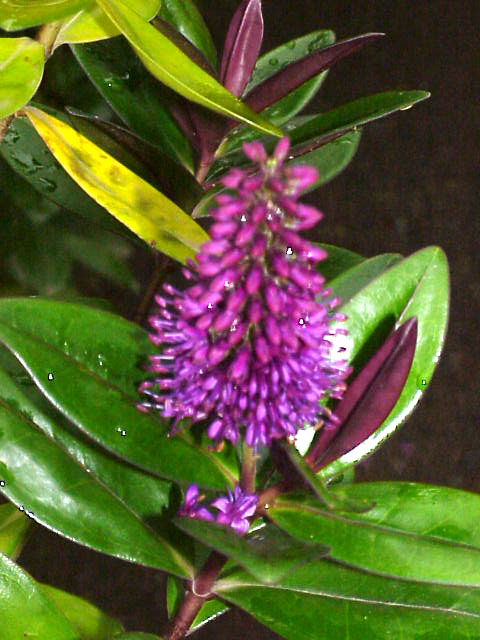
Veronica speciosa

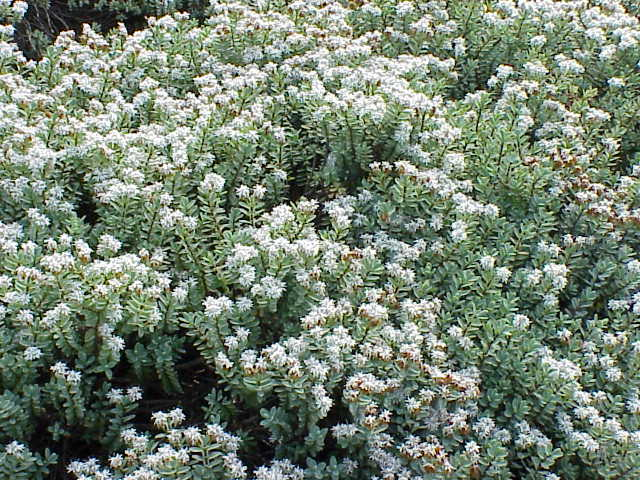
Veronica pinguifolia

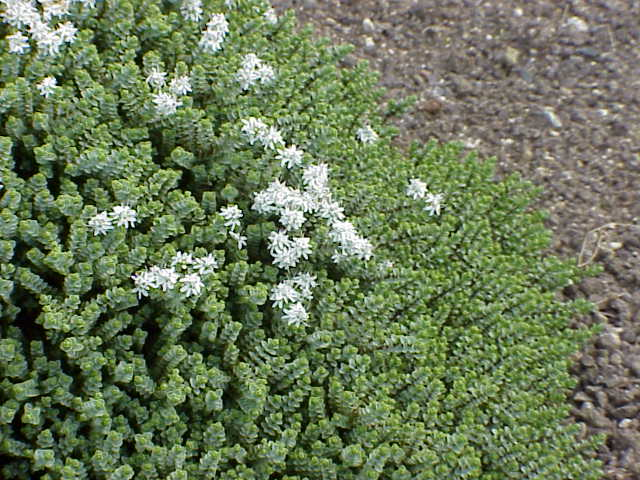
Veronica buchananii
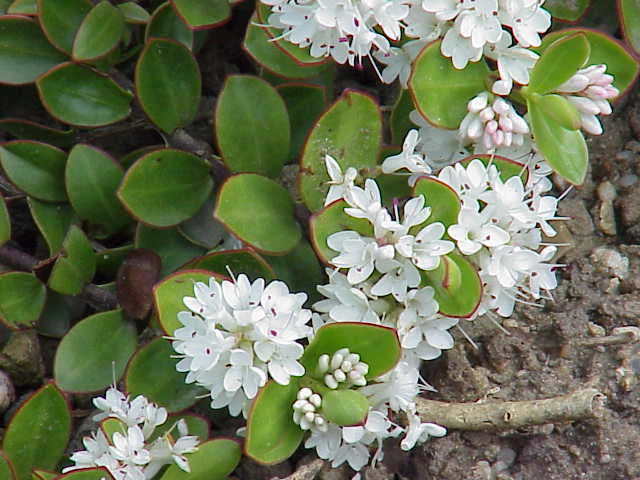
Veronica decumbens

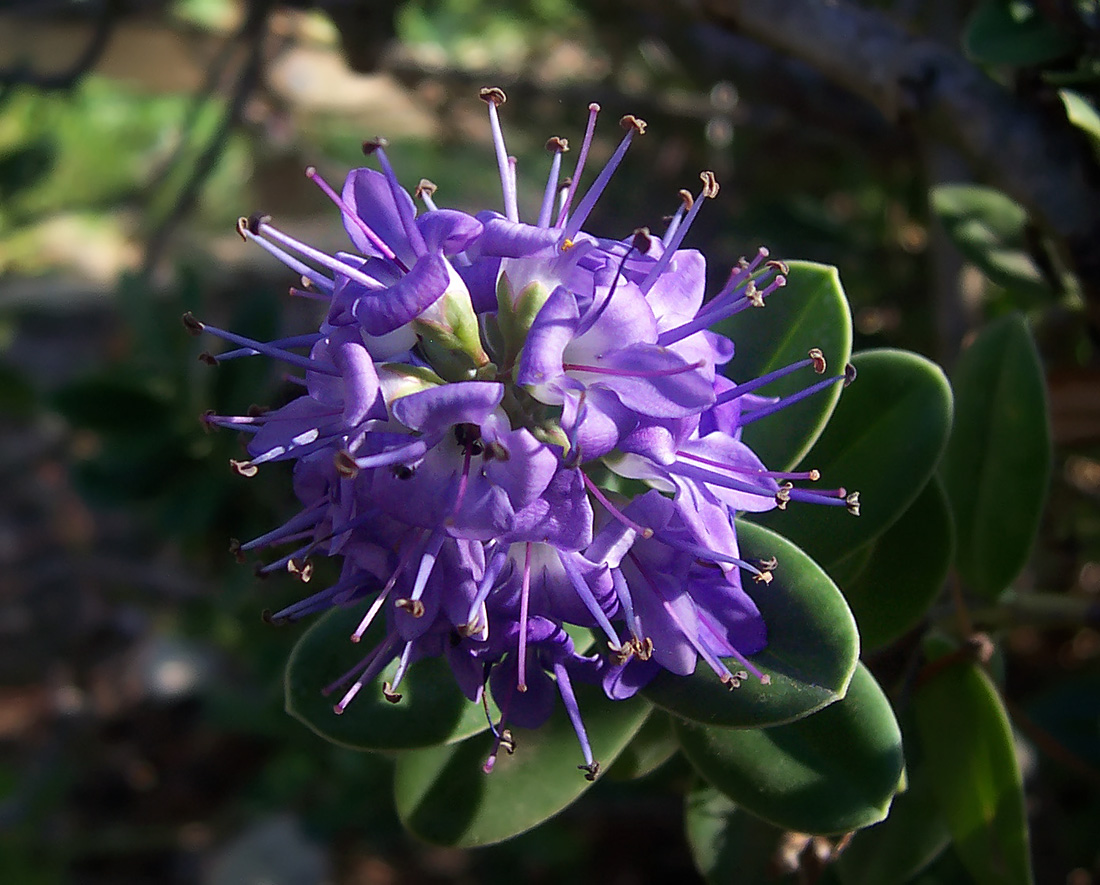
Flowers of Veronica × franciscana

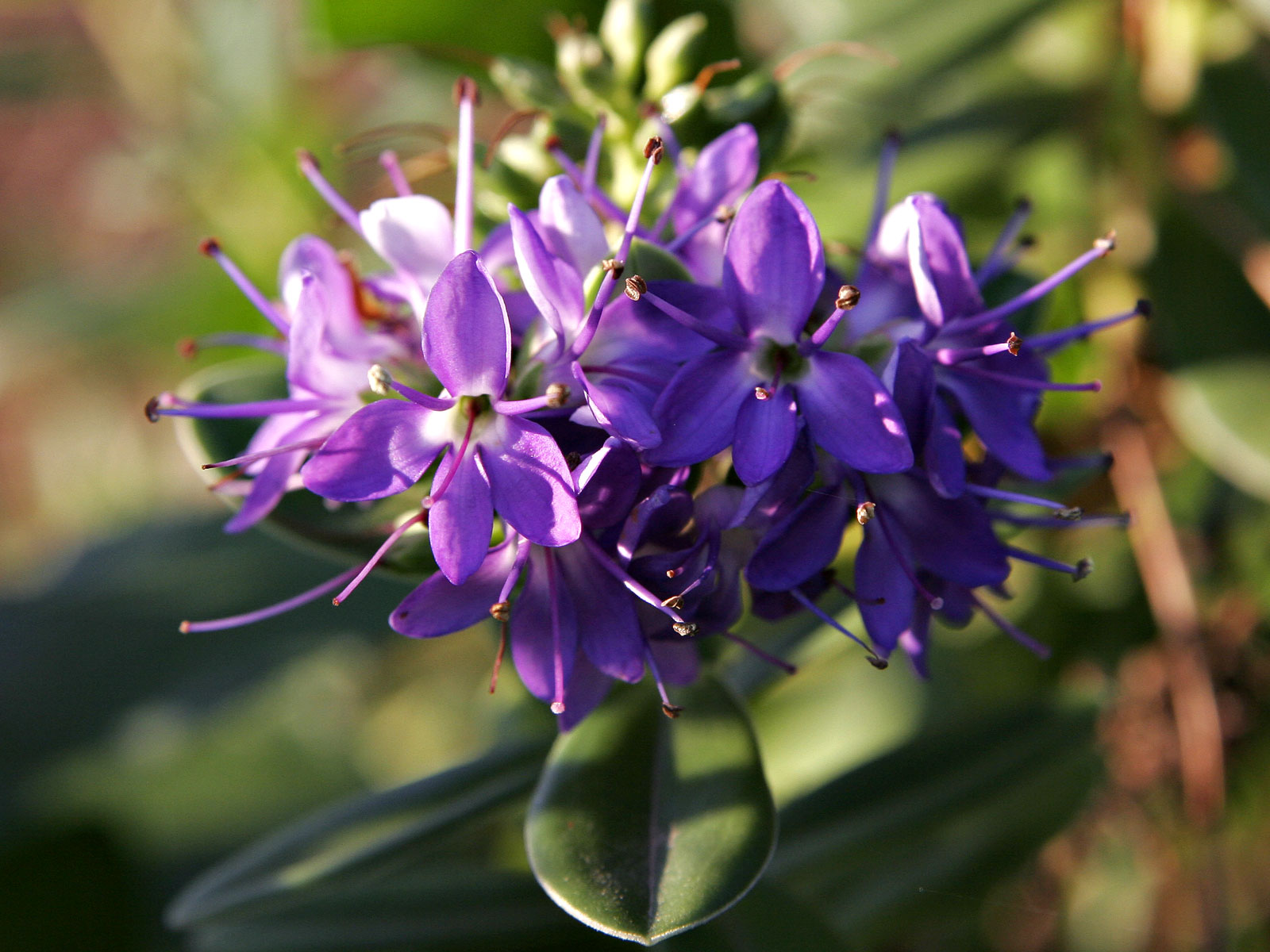
Flowers of Veronica × franciscana

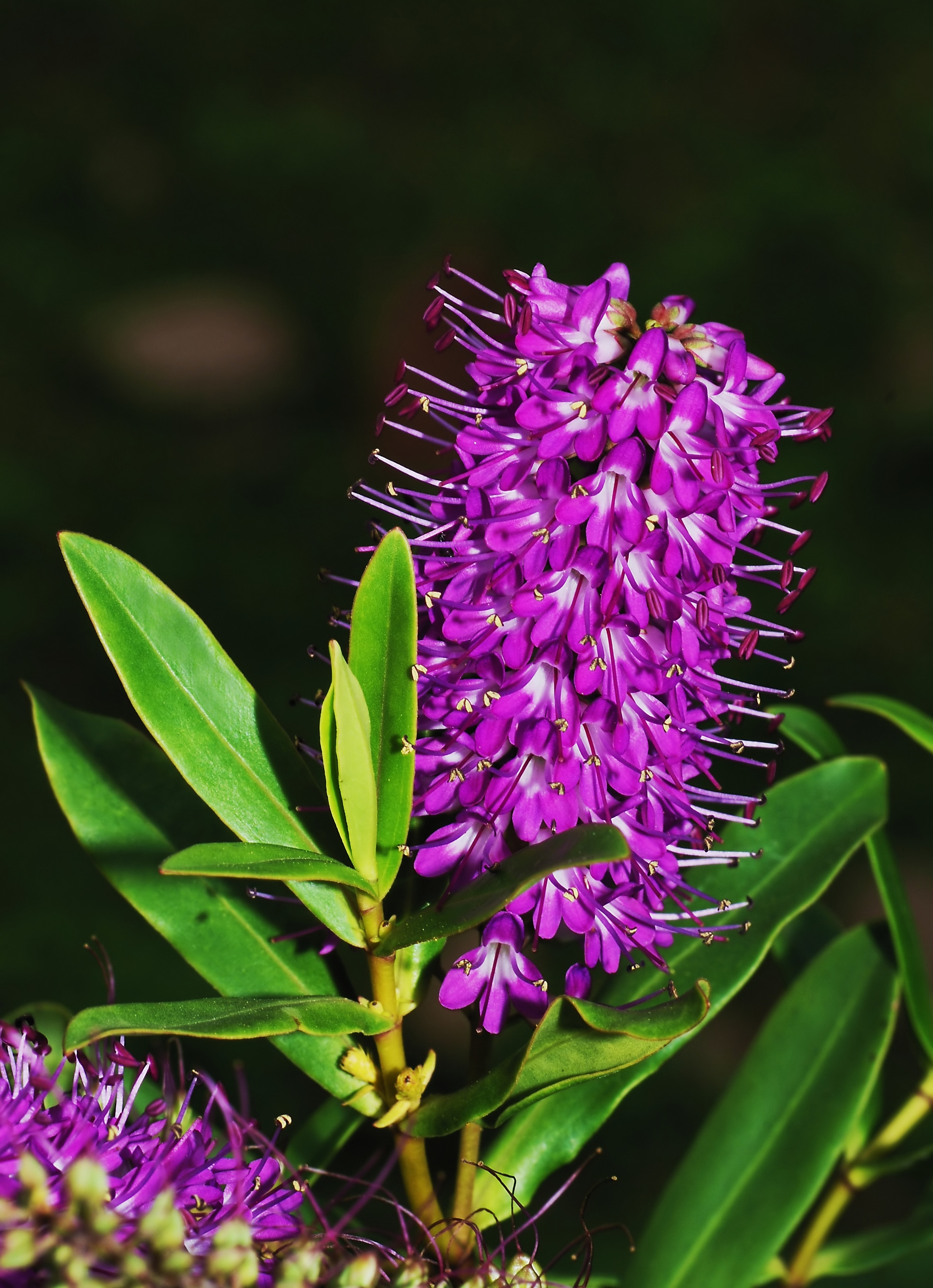
Veronica x franciscana (Blue Gem)
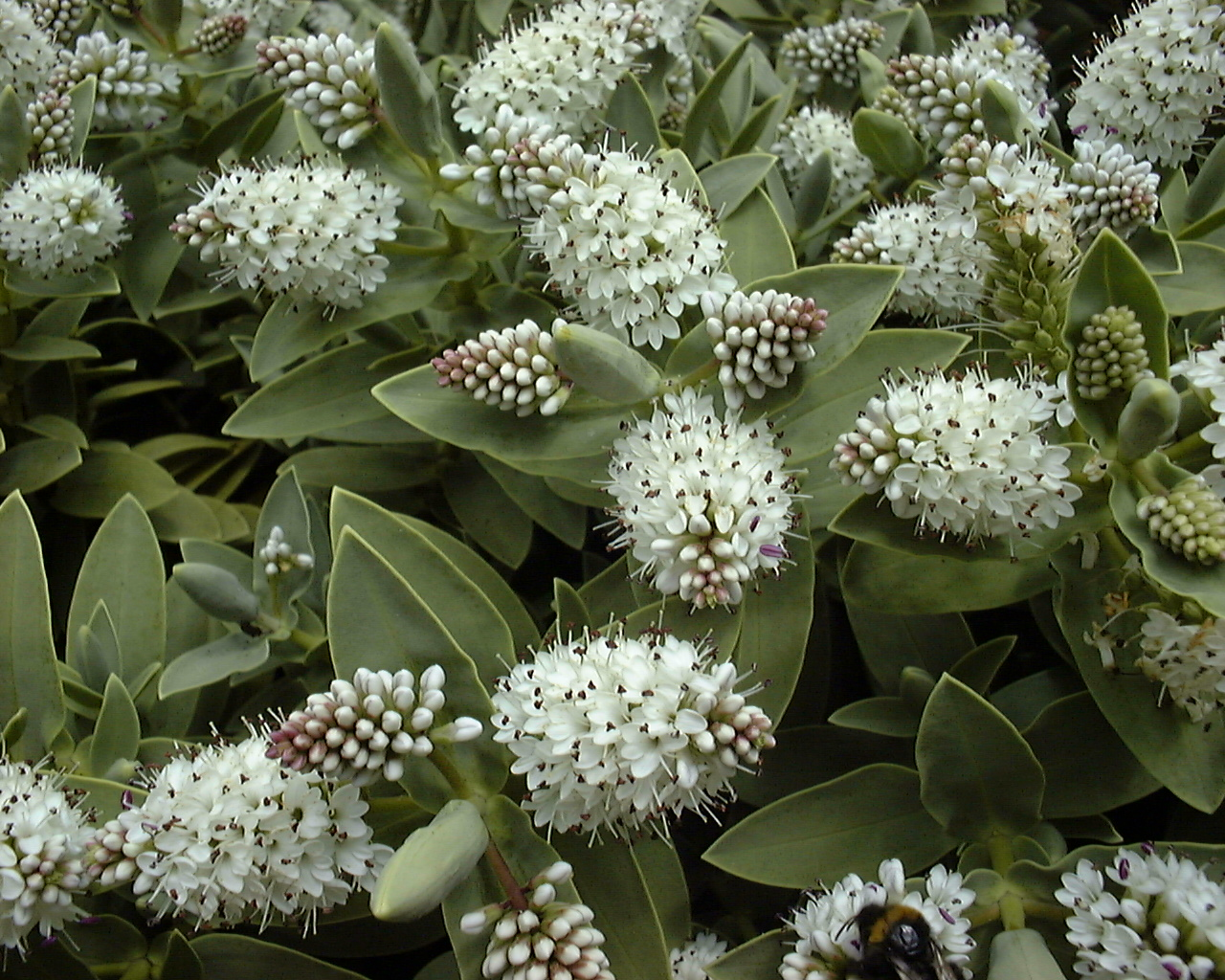
Veronica albicans

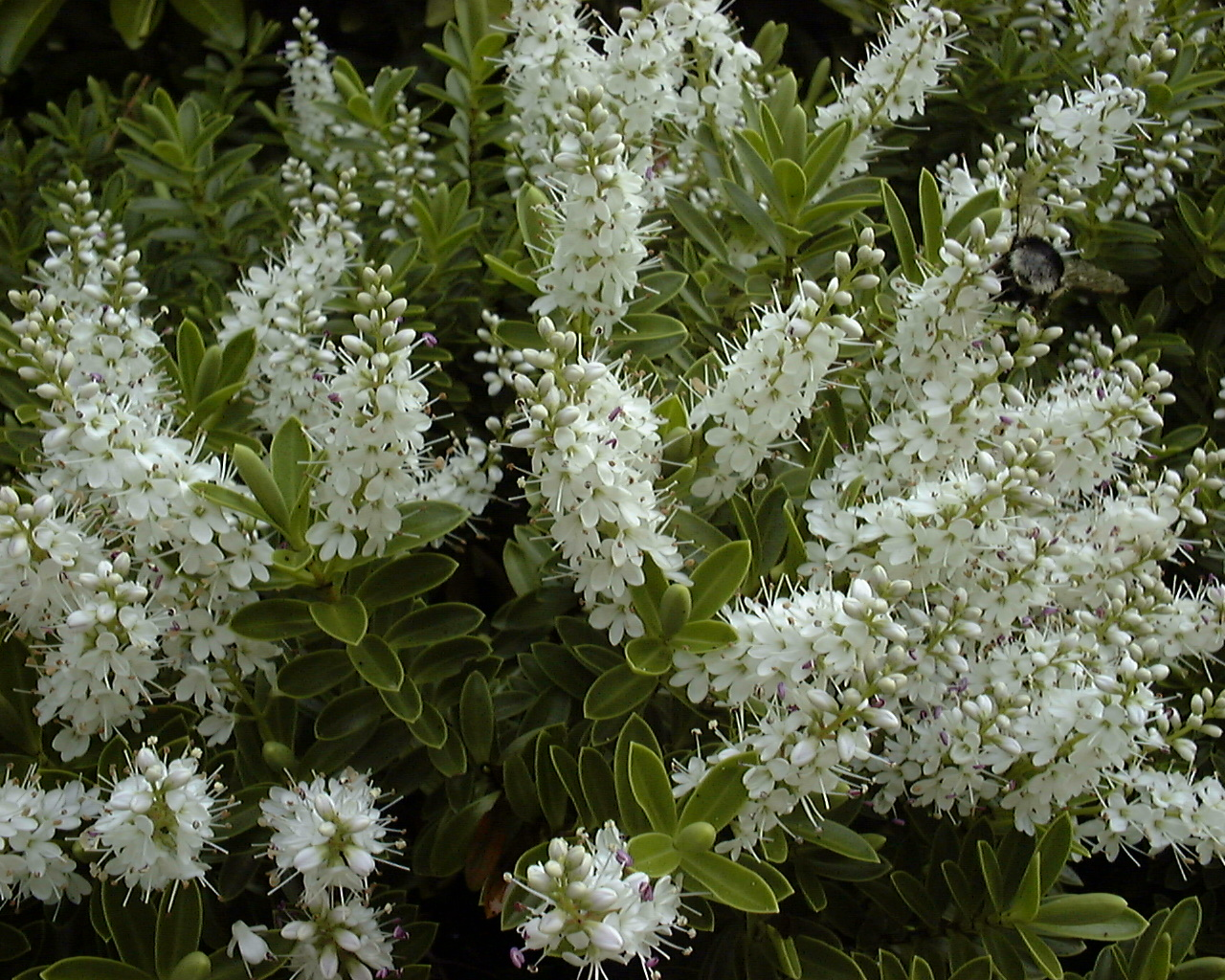
Veronica rakaiensis

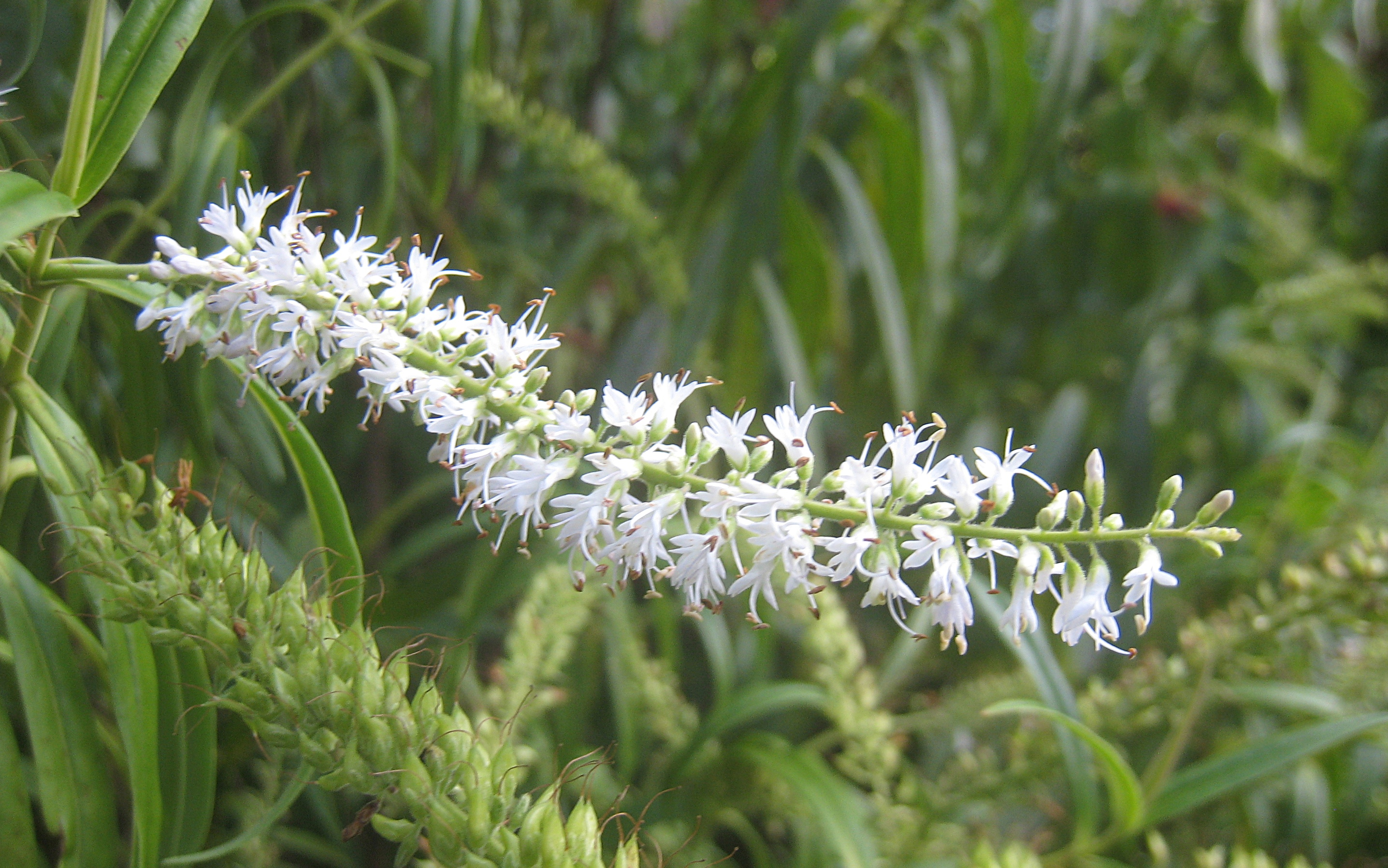
Veronica stricta
