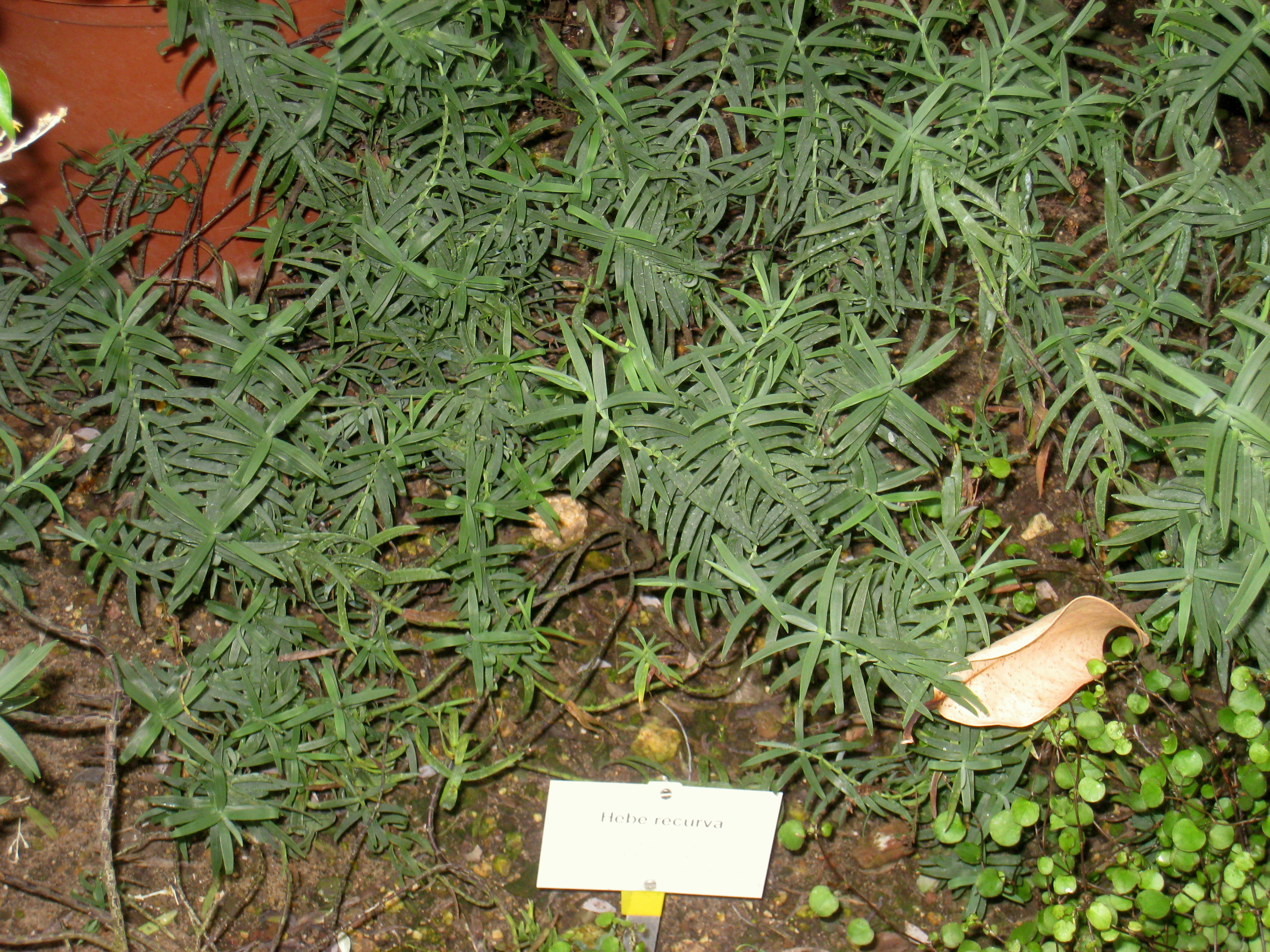

Scientific classification
- Kingdom: Plantae
- Clade: Tracheophytes
- Clade: Angiosperms
- Clade: Eudicots
- Clade: Asterids
- Order: Lamiales
- Family: Plantaginaceae
- Genus: Veronica
- Section: Veronica sect. Hebe
- Species: V. recurva

Binomial name
- Veronica recurva (G.Simpson & J.S.Thomson) ined.

Synonyms
- Hebe recurva G.Simpson & J.S.Thomson; ?Veronica albicans Petrie

= Veronica recurva =

Species of flowering plant

Veronica recurva, synonym Hebe recurva, is a flowering plant of the family Plantaginaceae, which is endemic to the north-west area of Nelson on the South Island of New Zealand. It is an evergreen shrub, reaching 60 cm (24 in) in height, with gray, spear-shaped leaves that are 2–4 cm long. Flowers are white.

Veronica recurva may be a synonym of Veronica albicans. As of October 2022, Plants of the World Online treated Hebe recurva as an unplaced name, and did not list Veronica recurva.

Mature leaves curve backwards slightly, hence the specific epithet recurva.

The cultivar 'Boughton Silver' has received the Royal Horticultural Society's Award of Garden Merit. Hardy down to −5 °C (23 °F), it requires a sheltered spot in full sun or partial shade.
