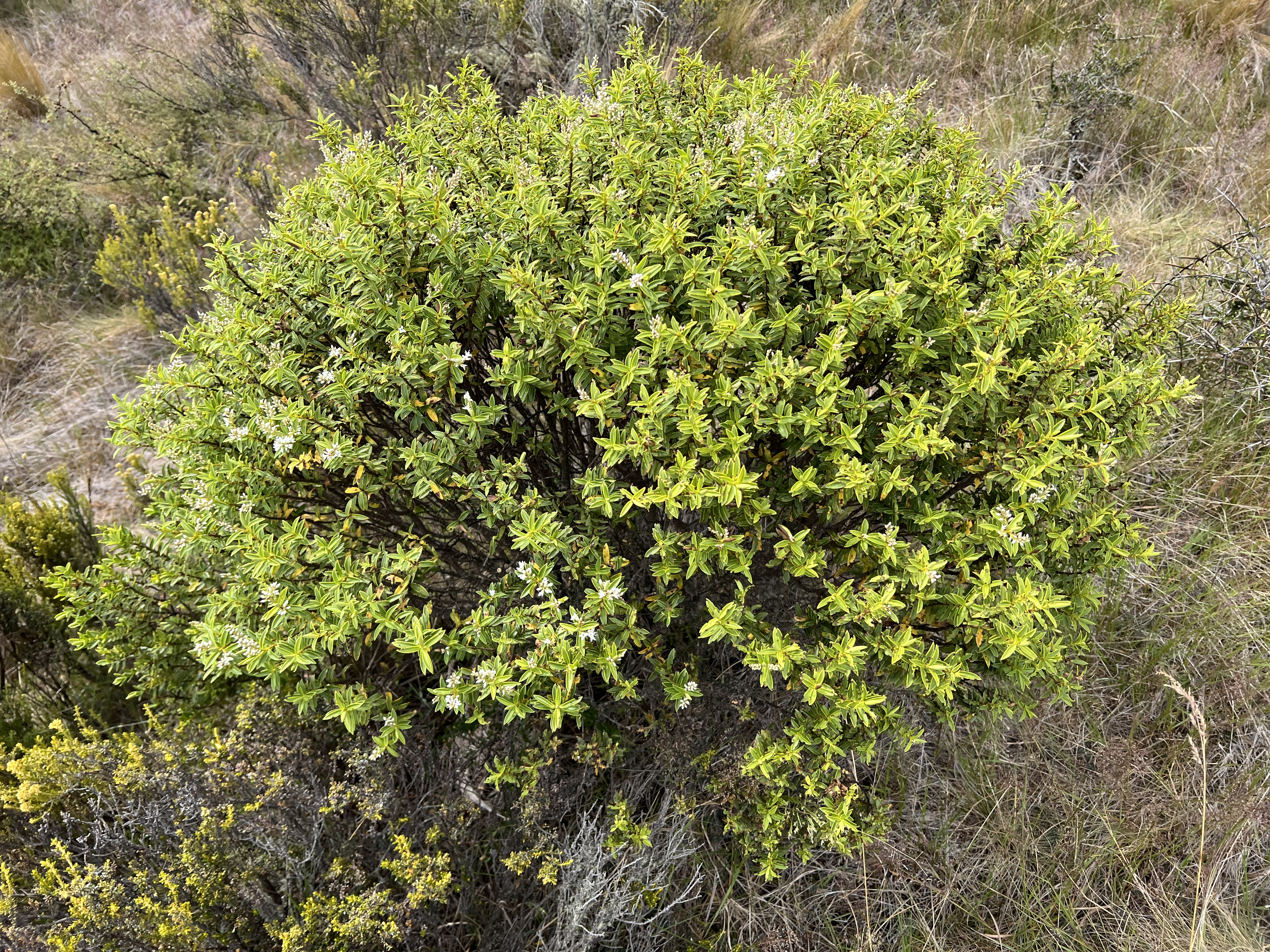

Conservation status
- Not Threatened (NZ TCS)

Scientific classification
- Kingdom: Plantae
- Clade: Tracheophytes
- Clade: Angiosperms
- Clade: Eudicots
- Clade: Asterids
- Order: Lamiales
- Family: Plantaginaceae
- Genus: Veronica
- Section: Veronica sect. Hebe
- Species: V. brachysiphon

Binomial name
- Veronica brachysiphon (Summerh.) Bean

Synonyms
- Hebe brachysiphon Summerh.

= Veronica brachysiphon =

Species of flowering plant

Veronica brachysiphon (formerly known as Hebe brachysiphon), is a species of shrubby plant in the family Plantaginaceae, endemic to New Zealand.

== Etymology ==
The name brachysiphon refers to its short flower tubes (brachy is of Greek origin which means 'short', siphon means a 'straw' or 'tube'), which distinguish it from V. traversii.

== Distribution ==
V. brachysiphon is found only in New Zealand, imostly in subalpine areas of Marlborough and Canterbury from the main divide to the eastern foothills. Its northern limit is the Red Hills Range near Nelson, and its southern is near Mount Hutt. It prefers shrubland but can be found in beech forest near the treeline.

== Description ==
This bushy, rounded shrub grows up to 1.8 m tall, and is usually closely branched and compact. The leaf buds have a small, narrow, acute sinus, distinguishing them from similar species. The leaves are variable, 8.5–25.5 mm long and 3.3–8 mm wide; they are not glaucous, but bright green and glossy with many stomata on the upper surface, usually more than in the closely related V. venustula.

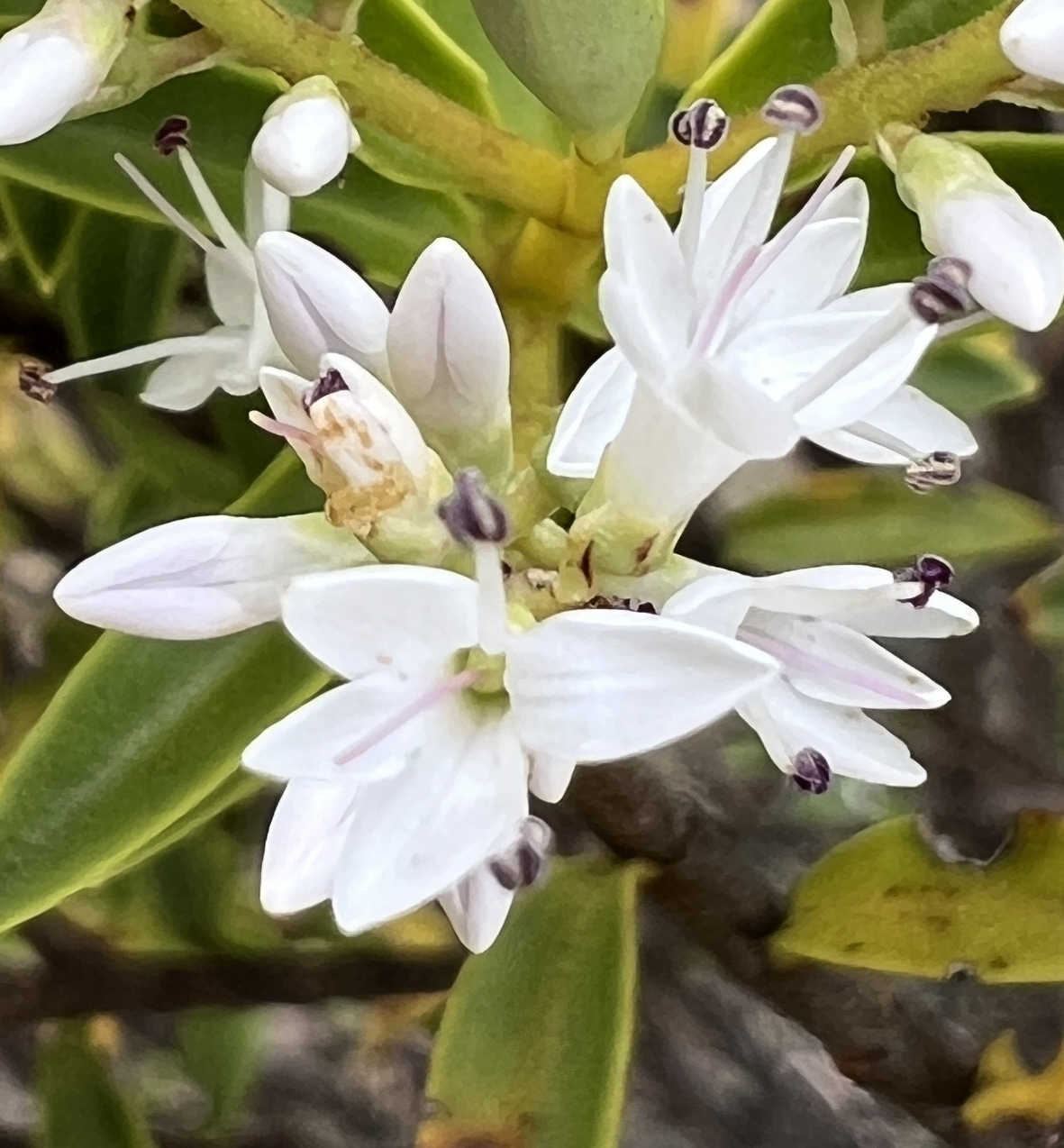
Flowers showing the extended corolla

V. brachysiphon usually flowers from December to February. The white flowers have mauve anthers and are pedicellate (borne on a stalk) with small bracts. The cylindrical or funnel-shaped tube of the corolla is longer than the calyces at its base, another distinctive feature of this species. Male and female flowers are carried on different plants.

V. brachysiphon can be confused with V. divaricata; although it is a compact subalpine shub with simple inflorescences, and V. divaricata is more open with branched inflorescences, some individuals in the Nelson Lakes area can be intermediate in form.
