= Veronica breviracemosa =

Conservation status
- Nationally Vulnerable (NZ TCS)

Scientific classification
- Kingdom: Plantae
- Clade: Tracheophytes
- Clade: Angiosperms
- Clade: Eudicots
- Clade: Asterids
- Order: Lamiales
- Family: Plantaginaceae
- Genus: Veronica
- Section: Veronica sect. Hebe
- Species: V. breviracemosa

Binomial name
- Veronica breviracemosa W.R.B.Oliv.

Synonyms
- Hebe breviracemosa (W.R.B.Oliv.) Andersen

Species of flowering plant

Veronica breviracemosa (synonym Hebe breviracemosa), the Kermadec koromiko, is a plant in the hebe group of the family Plantaginaceae, endemic to Raoul Island in New Zealand's Kermadec Islands, where it is found in coastal cliffs and headlands. Thought to be extinct for decades, a single individual was rediscovered in 1983, and the species has since been propagated and replanted on the island.

== Taxonomy ==
This is the only species of Veronica sect. Hebe (formerly the genus Hebe and its close southern hemisphere relatives) found in the subtropical Kermadec Islands. The Kermadecs are 976 kilometres (606 mi) north of New Zealand, the centre of diversity of the section. The species was one of several described by W.R.B. Oliver in 1909 from material collected on cliffs above Denham Bay, during a scientific expedition to Raoul Island undertaken from 31 December 1907 to 16 November 1908. The specific epithet Oliver chose, breviracemosa, refers to its clusters of flowers borne on short stalks (racemes) that barely extend past the leaves. The species was later transferred to the genus Hebe, then back to Veronica when that genus was revised.

== Description ==
Raceme and flowers

This shrub is loosely branching with long pointed leaves, and reaches 2 metres (6.6 ft) tall. Flowers are white to lilac or pale lavender, and around 6 millimetres (0.24 in) in diameter on crowded 10 cm (3.9 in) racemes. The petals of the corolla curve back almost to the calyx. In warmer parts of New Zealand V. breviracemosa can flower throughout the year, but further south flowering and fruiting is more common in summer.

== History ==
The species is very rare, and endemic to Raoul Island / Rangitāhua. When specimens were collected by Oliver in 1908, he noted the koromiko "has been almost killed out by goats". (Goats had been released onto Raoul by European settlers in 1836.) He observed it was "now only found in cliffs and other places inaccessible to these animals". V. breviracemosa was not sighted again for many years, and by 1977 it was regarded as "probably extinct".

In February 1983 a single young shrub was discovered on Hutchinson’s Buff, at the north-western end of the island, by hunter Ray Scrimgeour during one of the last goat eradication expeditions. (Note: Although some sources state the species was rediscovered the same day the last goat was shot, in fact it was not until November 1984 that hunter Andy Rostenburg killed the last goat on Raoul Island.) A cutting was sent back to Grounds Superintendent Tony Palmer of the University of Auckland, which successfully rooted, and for years all cultivated plants were derived from that single male-dominant individual; they do not easily set seed, so propagation is still generally from cuttings. In 1995 it was discovered the species easily hybridised with Veronica diosmifolia, so cultivated plants could no longer be used as a reliable seed source.

There was only one individual known in the wild until December 1997, when, as part of a weed-eradication program, workers abseiling down steep cliffs discovered a single seedling. In early 1998 fifty more plants were discovered. By this time the original 1983 plant had died, though a cutting from it had been planted at the same site in June 1993. The species propagated easily from cuttings, so by 1999 fifteen more plants had been reintroduced to the island; by 2007 the wild population was estimated at 200 individuals, and in 2009 this had risen to 450, and about 1000 in 2013. The main threats to V. breviracemosa were weeds invading its unstable cliff habitat, and, until they were eliminated from the island by a 2002 poisoning campaign, rats eating its seeds or seedlings. In 2005 the threat classification status for V. breviracemosa was "Nationally Critical", but since 2012 the increase in population downgraded its status to "Nationally Vulnerable".
