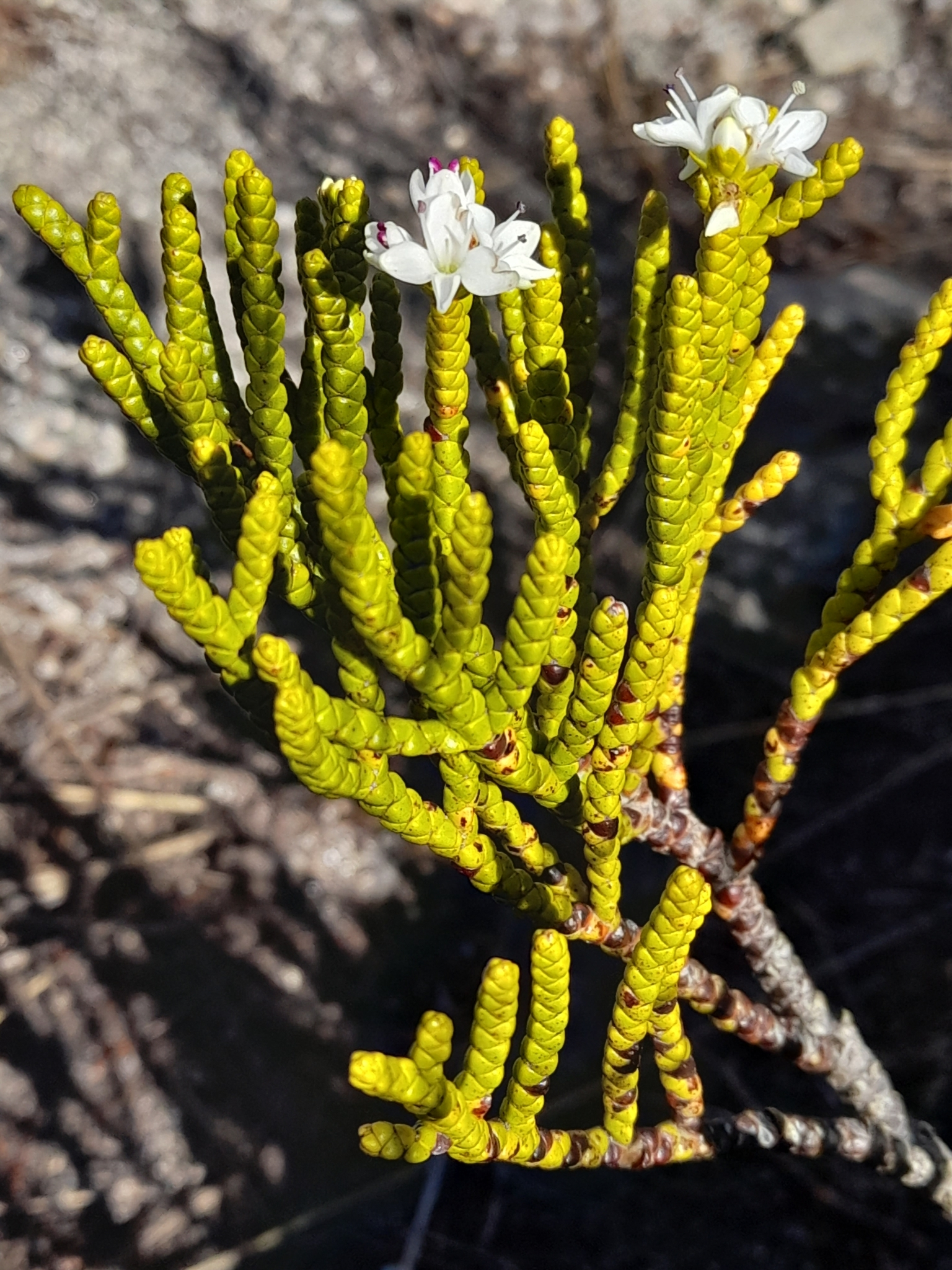
- Veronica hectorii in Fiordland

Conservation status
- Not Threatened (NZ TCS)

Scientific classification
- Kingdom: Plantae
- Clade: Embryophytes
- Clade: Tracheophytes
- Clade: Spermatophytes
- Clade: Angiosperms
- Clade: Eudicots
- Clade: Asterids
- Order: Lamiales
- Family: Plantaginaceae
- Genus: Veronica
- Species: V. hectorii

Binomial name
- Veronica hectorii Hook.f.

= Veronica hectorii =

Species of flowering plant

Veronica hectorii is a species of Veronica, endemic to New Zealand.

== Description ==
A small shrub that grows up to 1 metre (3 ft 3 in) in height. Compared to Veronica tetragona, the leaf apex is not thickened.

== Distribution and habitat ==
Veronica hectorii subsp. hectorii and subsp. demissa are known from southern South Island, from Aoraki / Mount Cook south, as well as Stewart Island. V. hectorii subsp. coarctata is found in the north and west of the South Island.

This species is known from subalpine and low alpine areas.

== Etymology ==
hectorii is named for James Hector.

== Taxonomy ==
Veronica hectorii contains the following subspecies:

- Veronica hectorii subsp. coarctata
- Veronica hectorii subsp. demissa
- Veronica hectorii subsp. hectorii
