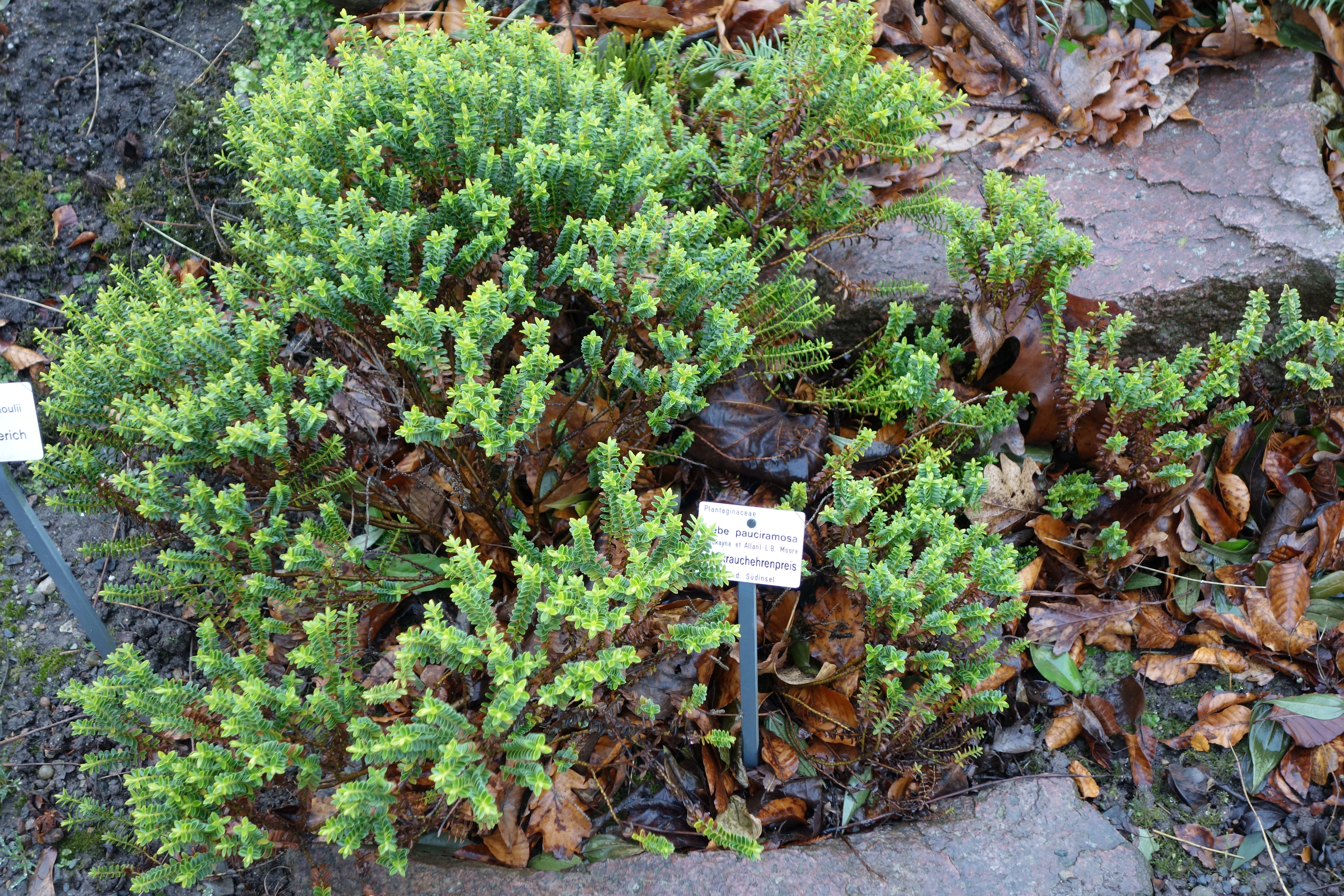

Scientific classification
- Kingdom: Plantae
- Clade: Tracheophytes
- Clade: Angiosperms
- Clade: Eudicots
- Clade: Asterids
- Order: Lamiales
- Family: Plantaginaceae
- Genus: Veronica
- Section: Veronica sect. Hebe
- Species: V. pauciramosa

Binomial name
- Veronica pauciramosa (Cockayne & Allan) Garn.-Jones

Synonyms
- Hebe pauciramosa (Cockayne & Allan) L.B.Moore; Leonohebe pauciramosa (Cockayne & Allan) Heads

= Veronica pauciramosa =

Species of flowering plant

Veronica pauciramosa, synonym Hebe pauciramosa, is a species of plant in the family Plantaginaceae. It is endemic to the South Island of New Zealand, where it grows in mountains. It is an upright, evergreen shrub about 16 in (40 cm) tall, with green, spear-shaped leaves 0.2 in (6 mm) long, and white flowers.

Hebe pauciramosa var. masoniae L.B.Moore is now treated as a separate species, Veronica masoniae.
