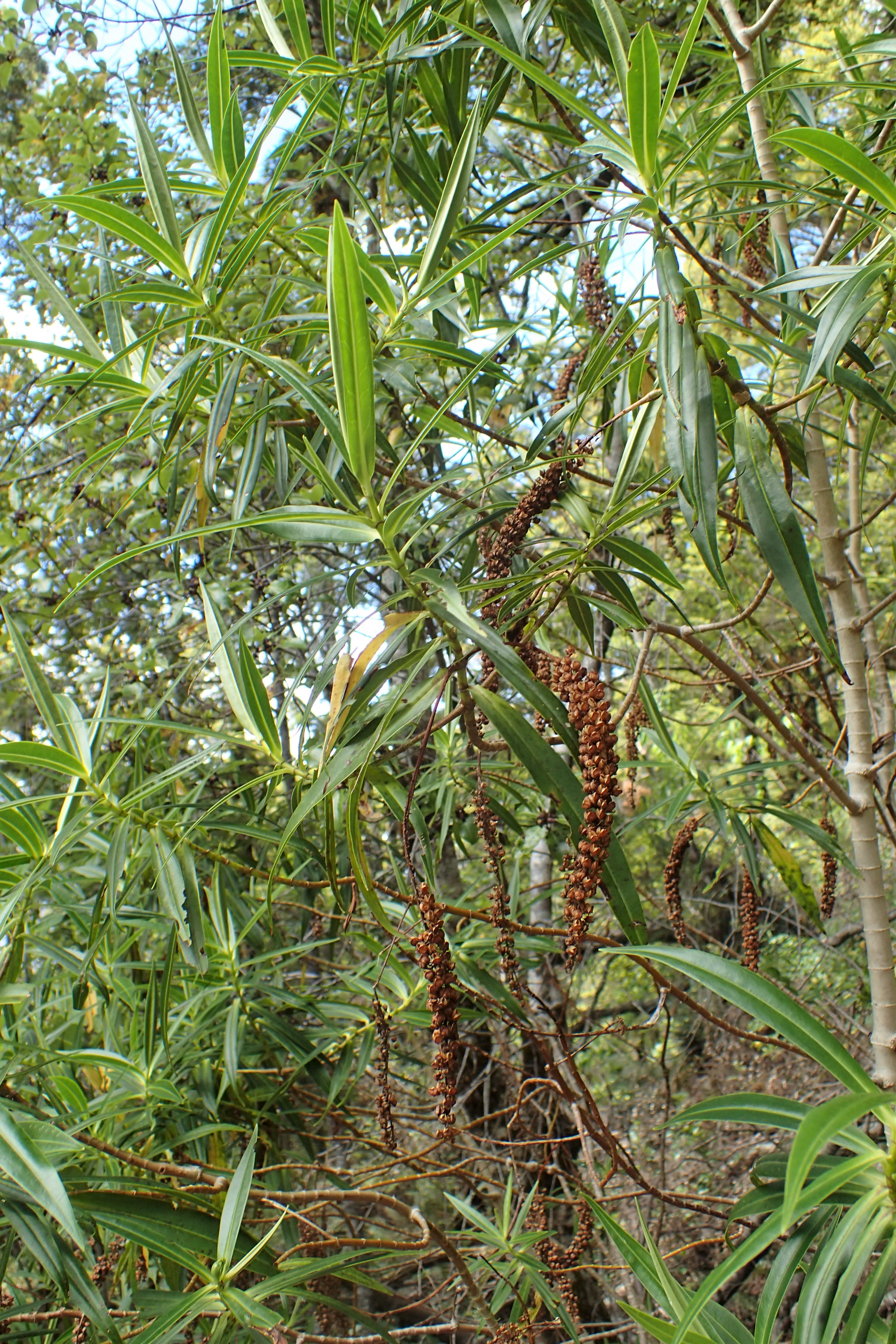
- Veronica salicifolia in Aoraki / Mount Cook National Park

Conservation status
- Not Threatened (NZ TCS)

Scientific classification
- Kingdom: Plantae
- Clade: Tracheophytes
- Clade: Angiosperms
- Clade: Eudicots
- Clade: Asterids
- Order: Lamiales
- Family: Plantaginaceae
- Genus: Veronica
- Section: Veronica sect. Hebe
- Species: V. salicifolia

Binomial name
- Veronica salicifolia G.Forst.

Synonyms
- Hebe fonkii (Phil.) Cockayne & Allan; Hebe salicifolia (G.Forst.) Pennell; Hebe salicifolia var. communis Cockayne & Allan; Panoxis salicifolia (G.Forst.) Raf.; Veronica fonkii Phil.; Veronica forsteri F.Muell, nom. superfl.; Veronica lindleyana Paxton; Veronica salicifolia var. communis Cockayne

= Veronica salicifolia =

Species of flowering plant in the plantain family

Veronica salicifolia, synonym Hebe salicifolia, the koromiko, or willow-leaf hebe, is a flowering plant in the family Plantaginaceae, which is found throughout the South Island of New Zealand and in Chile. It is a large, evergreen shrub, reaching two metres (6 ft 7 in) in height, with light-green, spear-shaped leaves that are up to twelve centimetres (4.7 in) long, and white or pale lilac flowers.

== Description ==
The overall form of V. salicifolia can be described as "willow-like" due to its drooping appearance, hence the name New Zealand willow. Unlike most Hebes that contain erect seeding structures, it has downward hanging capsules that disperse via gravity. V. salicifolia is one of the larger hebe species, its woody structure allowing it to grow to around one to five meters tall and it can have quite a wide spread foliage. Its narrow, oblong shaped leaves are oppositely arranged and are a dark to yellowish green colour, they also have hairs situated on the mid rib of the leaf. H. salicifolia is perennial and flowers in Summer and Autumn, producing multiple white and/or violet flowers can be found clustered together on stems that grow up to 24 centimetres (9.4 in) long. It is also one of the few Hebes that have a pleasantly strong scent. They also produce a generous amount of nectar in comparison to other Hebes. Some of the less obvious structures that help distinguish it from other Hebes are its distinctive leaf buds, large nodules and shape and colour of its reproductive structures. For example, the stamens are considered to be short and the anthers are violet in colour.

== Distribution and habitat ==
Veronica salicifolia is found in Chile, the South Island of New Zealand, as well as the Stewart and Auckland Islands. It has also been recorded as naturalised in Europe. As a form expressing a wide diversity in ecology and morphology, it inhabits regions from coastal margins to alpine regions up to 2,800 metres (9,200 ft) above sea level, which is regarded to be the highest place for a flowering plant in New Zealand.

== Ecology ==
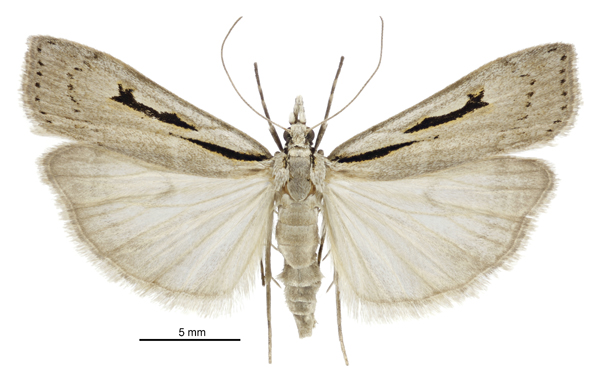
New Zealand moth S. rotuella, known to pollinate V. salicifolia

Veronica salicifolia attracts a wide range of unspecialized and promiscuous insects. Beetles and flies, especially syrphids, collect mainly pollen, whereas bees visited the flowers for both pollen and nectar, and tachinid flies and Lepidoptera primarily collect nectar. Especially at low altitudes, small native solitary bees and flies are common visitors. More specific survey was made by Mark & Steve (2013), native butterflies of New Zealand have been feeding on nectar of Veronica spp. The New Zealand endemic moth Scoparia rotuella is known to pollinate this species. As shown in the laboratory test, its flowers significantly increased the fitness of female butterflies. The Australasian green shield bugs often sit their egg shells on a wide variety of native and naturalised trees and shrubs including Koromiko. Adults and juveniles of Australasian green shield bugs feed by inserting a stylet into the plant and then suck plant sap and berries. As for diseases, leaf spot and downy mildew may occur in poor condition.

== Taxonomy ==
Veronica salicifolia is thought to be one of the first New Zealand hebe species to be described by the English during Captain Cook's second voyage in 1773, by botanist Georg Forster and his father Johann Reinhold Forster. Hebes found up North in the Waitākere Ranges were once mistaken for it due to their similar white and violet flowers, these are now distinguished as separate locally endemic Hebe.

== Cultivation ==
Veronica salicifolia is a hardy plant but is not tolerant of shade and needs to be in grown in full sun and in a sheltered area with a well drained soil. It can, however, tolerate wet areas and can often be found on the edge of bush and wetlands.

Once established, they have considerable drought tolerance and also have been found to be tolerant of freezing. In the test, 50% damage to leaves was reported at −0.6 °C (30.9 °F). Technically, H. salicifolia has closed vegetative buds, which could give protection from frost by covering the vulnerable apex, and only open when fully grown. However, Dallimore (1913) pointed that most Hebe is only specialized in habitats similar to New Zealand. Hebe may not be hardy except when grown in the southern and western countries of England, the west of Scotland, Ireland and various islands off the west coast of Britain.

== In Māori culture ==
Before the arrival of Europeans, the Māori had been utilizing the plants medicinal properties for centuries. The leaves were chewed to help cure diarrhoea and applied to the skin to aid ulcers and wounds. Koromiko is the general name for the hebes in the Māori language and is shared over a range of New Zealand Hebe species such as the shore koromiko (Veronica elliptica) and varnished koromiko (Veronica vernicosa), for example.
