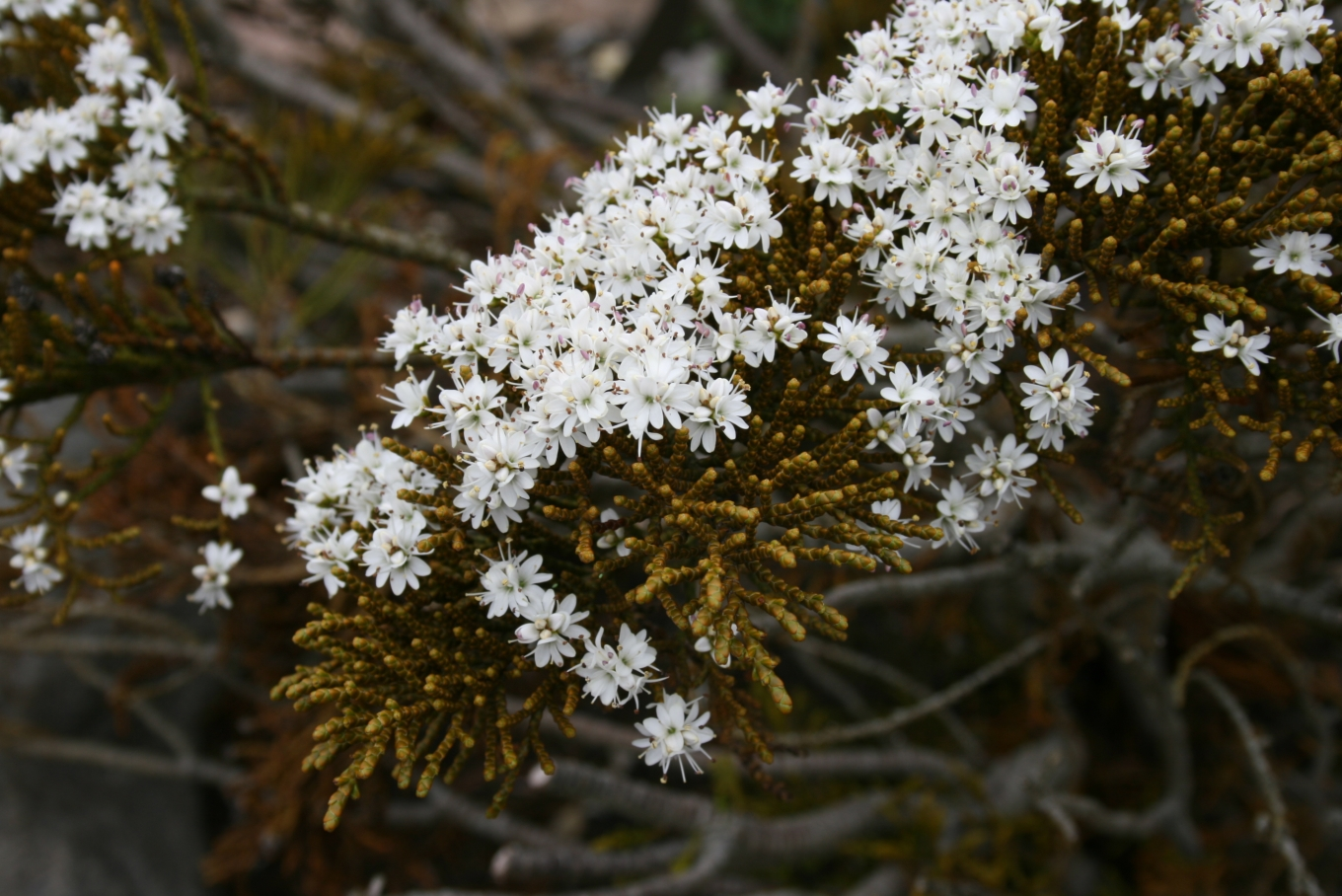

Scientific classification
- Kingdom: Plantae
- Clade: Tracheophytes
- Clade: Angiosperms
- Clade: Eudicots
- Clade: Asterids
- Order: Lamiales
- Family: Plantaginaceae
- Genus: Veronica
- Section: Veronica sect. Hebe
- Species: V. ochracea

Binomial name
- Veronica ochracea (Ashwin) Garn.-Jones

Synonyms
- Hebe ochracea Ashwin; Leonohebe ochracea (Ashwin) Heads

= Veronica ochracea =

Species of flowering plant

Veronica ochracea, synonym Hebe ochracea, is an ornamental plant of the family Plantaginaceae, which is endemic to the South Island of New Zealand. Hardy to USDA climate zones 7–8 at least, protect aerial plant parts from severe frosts like any other hebe.

Veronica ochracea is also cultivated on the Galapagos Islands.
