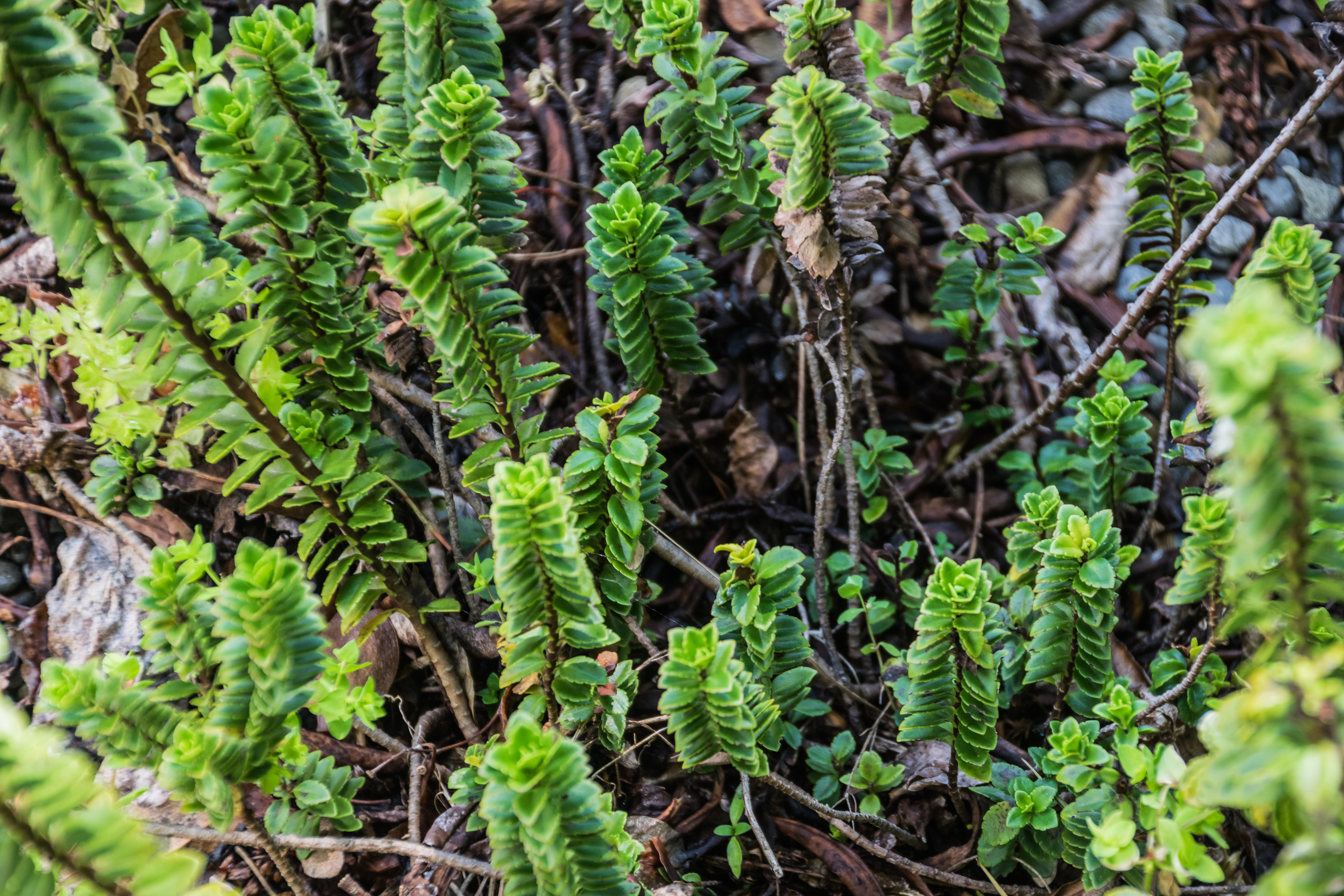
- In cultivation

Scientific classification
- Kingdom: Plantae
- Clade: Tracheophytes
- Clade: Angiosperms
- Clade: Eudicots
- Clade: Asterids
- Order: Lamiales
- Family: Plantaginaceae
- Genus: Veronica
- Section: Veronica sect. Hebe
- Species: V. macrantha

Binomial name
- Veronica macrantha Hook.f.

Synonyms
- Hebe macrantha (Hook.f.) Cockayne & Allan; Parahebe macrantha (Hook.f.) Heads

= Veronica macrantha =

Species of flowering plant

Veronica macrantha, the large-flowered hebe, is a species of flowering plant in the family Plantaginaceae, native to New Zealand's South Island. As its synonym Hebe macrantha, it has gained the Royal Horticultural Society's Award of Garden Merit.
