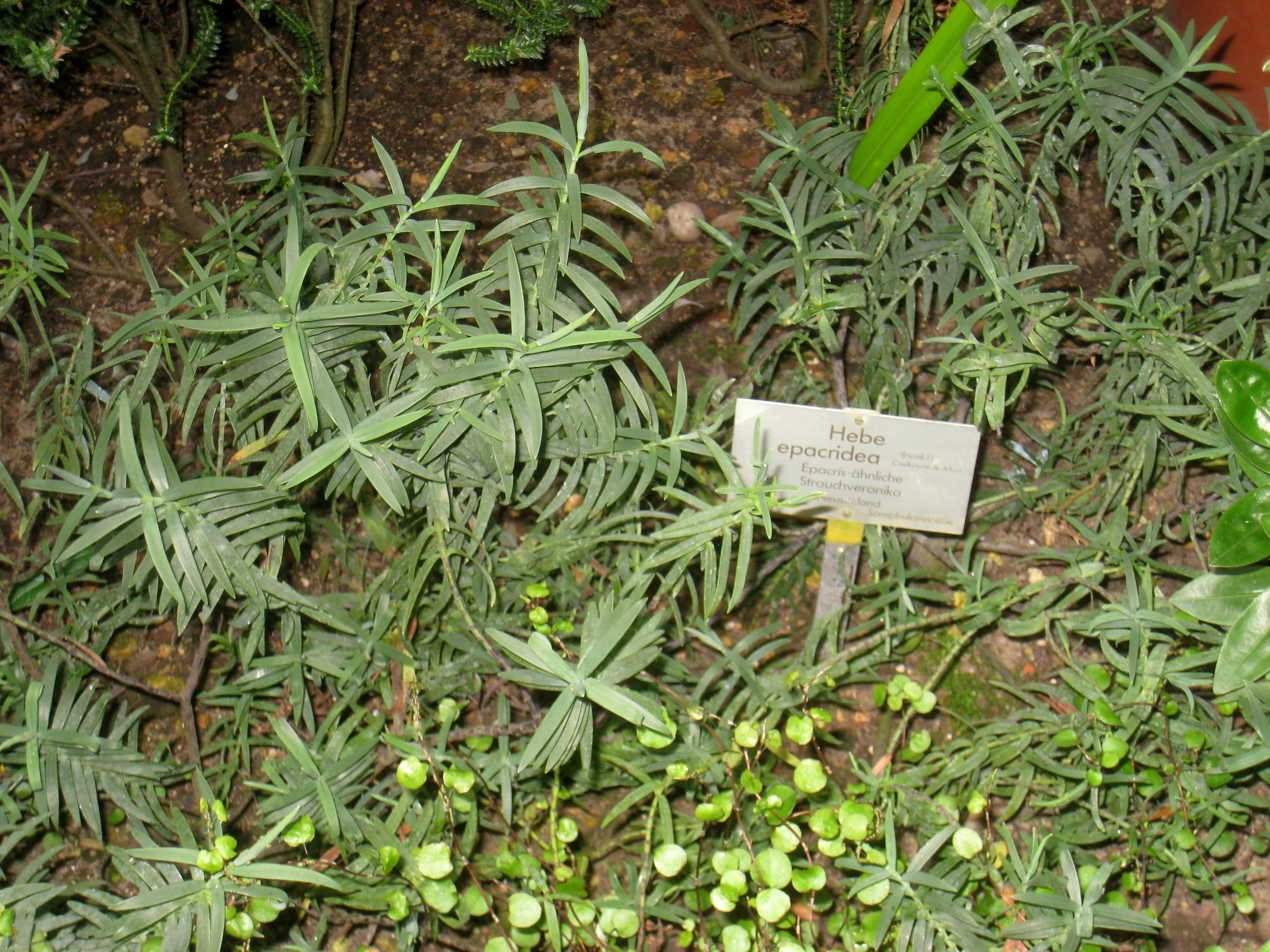

Scientific classification
- Kingdom: Plantae
- Clade: Tracheophytes
- Clade: Angiosperms
- Clade: Eudicots
- Clade: Asterids
- Order: Lamiales
- Family: Plantaginaceae
- Genus: Veronica
- Section: Veronica sect. Hebe
- Species: V. epacridea

Binomial name
- Veronica epacridea Hook.f.

Synonyms
- Hebe epacridea (Hook.f.) Andersen; Leonohebe epacridea (Hook.f.) Heads

= Veronica epacridea =

Species of flowering plant

Veronica epacridea, synonym Hebe epacridea, is a plant of the family Plantaginaceae. It is endemic to altitudes above 3,000 feet from the Marlborough Region to Otago region on the South Island of New Zealand. It is a low-growing, evergreen shrub, reaching 10 cm in height, with thick, closely placed, recurved green leaves that are 5–7 mm long. Flowers are white.
