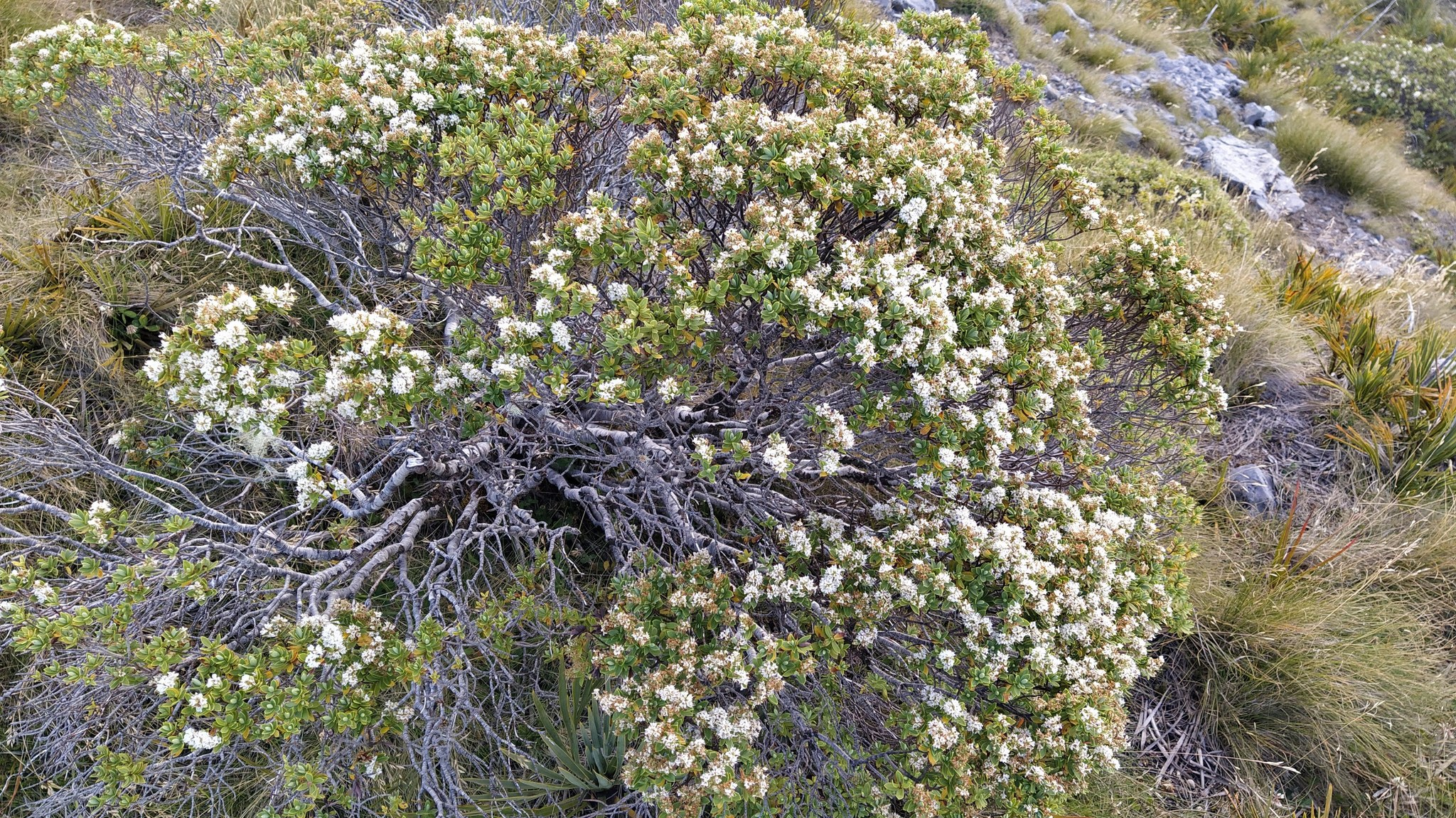
- Habit

Scientific classification
- Kingdom: Plantae
- Clade: Tracheophytes
- Clade: Angiosperms
- Clade: Eudicots
- Clade: Asterids
- Order: Lamiales
- Family: Plantaginaceae
- Genus: Veronica
- Section: Veronica sect. Hebe
- Species: V. topiaria

Binomial name
- Veronica topiaria (L.B.Moore) Garn.-Jones

Synonyms
- Hebe topiaria L.B.Moore

= Veronica topiaria =

Species of flowering plant

Veronica topiaria, the topiarist's hebe, is a species of flowering plant in the family Plantaginaceae, native to the South Island of New Zealand. As its synonym Hebe topiaria it has gained the Royal Horticultural Society's Award of Garden Merit.
