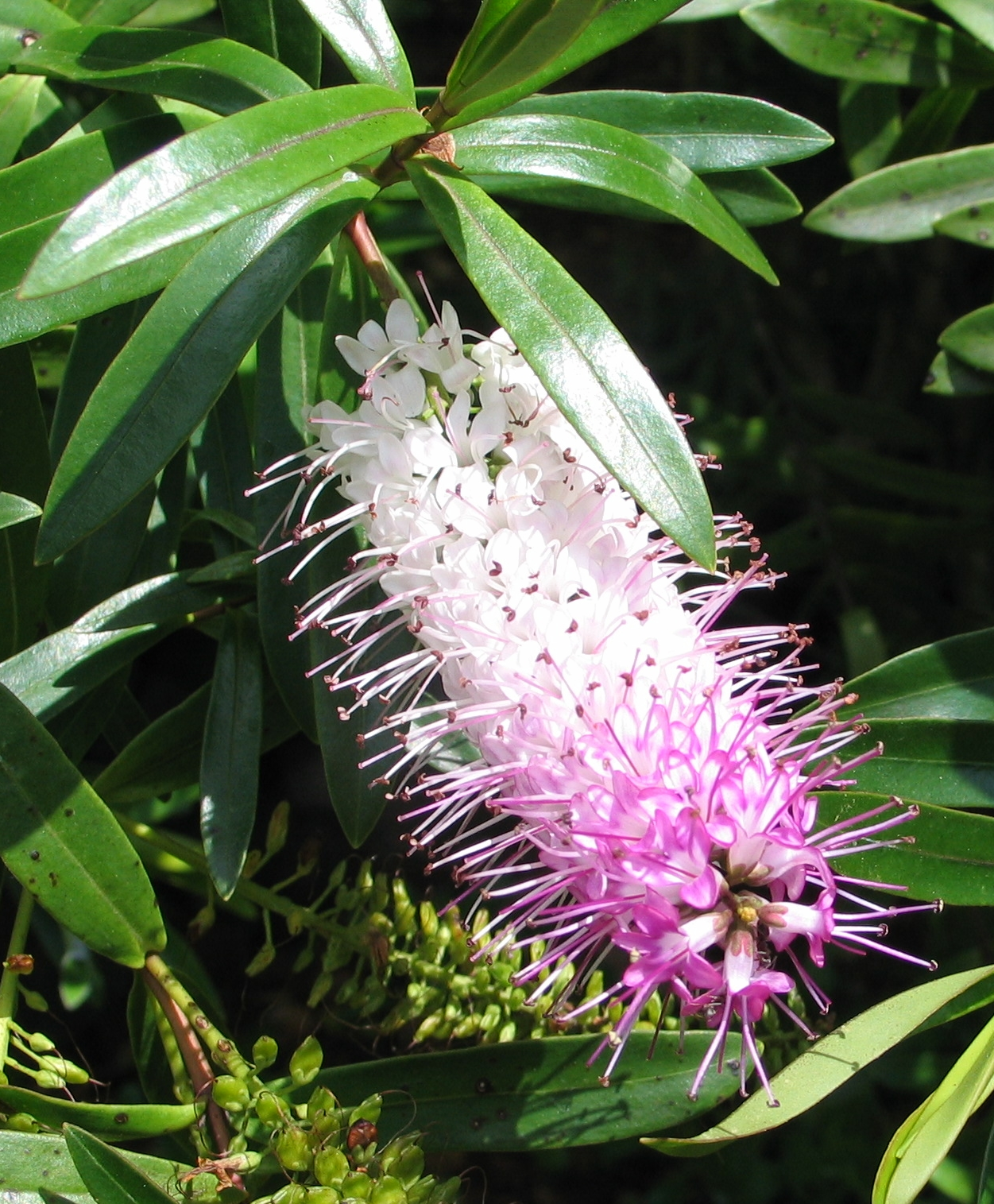

Scientific classification
- Kingdom: Plantae
- Clade: Tracheophytes
- Clade: Angiosperms
- Clade: Eudicots
- Clade: Asterids
- Order: Lamiales
- Family: Plantaginaceae
- Genus: Veronica
- Section: Veronica sect. Hebe
- Species: V. speciosa

Binomial name
- Veronica speciosa R.Cunn. ex A.Cunn

Synonyms
- Hebe speciosa (R.Cunn. ex A.Cunn.) Andersen; Hebe imperialis (Bouch.) Cockayne; Veronica kermesina Loudon

= Veronica speciosa =

Species of flowering plant

Veronica speciosa, synonym Hebe speciosa, is a species of flowering plant in the family Plantaginaceae, known by the common names New Zealand hebe, showy hebe, showy-speedwell, and the Māori names titirangi and napuka. Like most hebes, it is native to New Zealand but it can be found in other parts of the world where it is grown as an ornamental for its showy flowers.

== Description ==
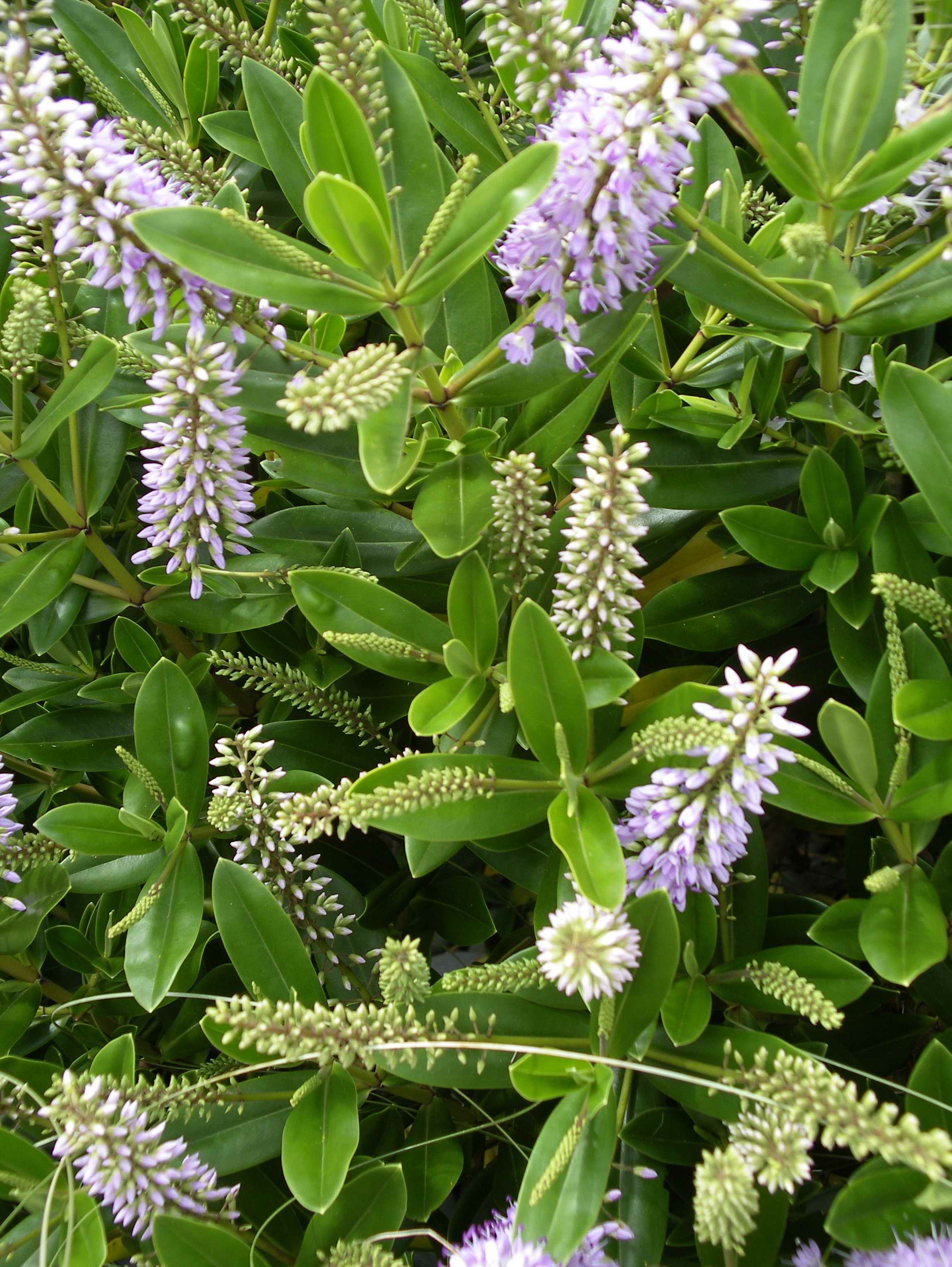
Full view of plant

Veronica speciosa is a shrub reaching heights between one and two meters. Its evergreen leaves are dark green, shiny, and quite thick, usually measuring 2 to 5 centimeters long. The inflorescence is up to 8 centimeters long and densely packed with pale pink to bright magenta flowers. Each flower is just under a centimeter wide and has a short throat spreading into a four-lobed corolla. Two very long stamens protrude from the throat of each flower, giving the inflorescence a whiskery look. The fruit is a capsule containing flat, smooth seeds.

== Cultivation ==
Its many cultivars and hybrids are very popular garden plants in area with suitably mild temperate climates. Many can even be grown outdoors in sheltered parts of southern Britain. They appeal because of their lush evergreen foliage, showy flowerheads, long blooming season and ease of cultivation.

Popular cultivars include the purple-flowered 'Alicia Amherst' and deep pink 'Simon Deleaux'. Hybrids includes cultivars of Veronica × andersonii (Veronica salicifolia × Veronica speciosa), especially the variegated 'Andersonii'; and Veronica × franciscana (Veronica elliptica × Veronica speciosa) cultivars such as 'Blue Gem' and 'Waireka'.

Veronica speciosa is included in the Tasmanian Fire Service's list of low flammability plants, indicating that it is suitable for growing within a building protection zone.
