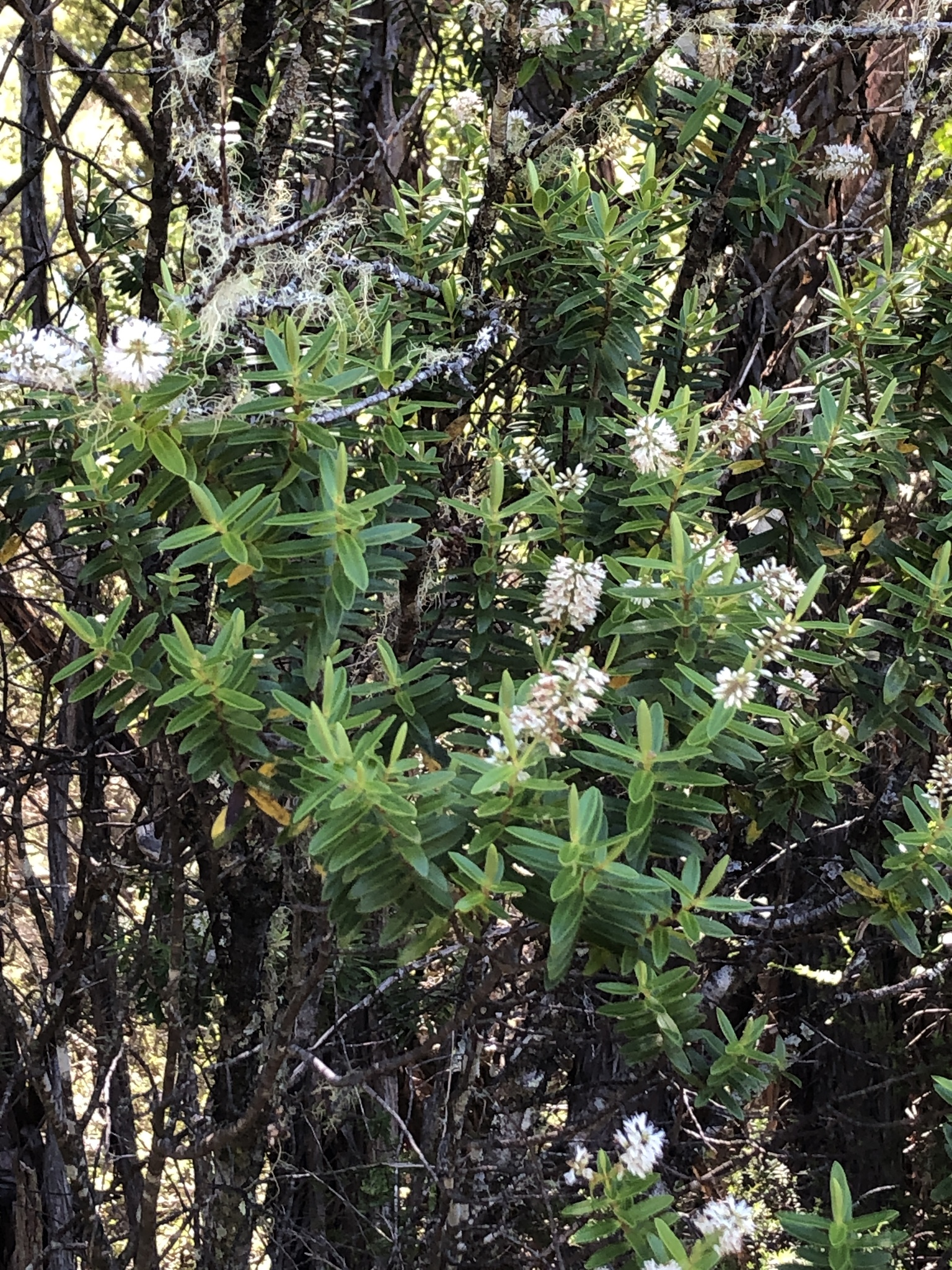
- Veronica leiophylla in Nelson Lakes National Park

Conservation status
- Not Threatened (NZ TCS)

Scientific classification
- Kingdom: Plantae
- Clade: Tracheophytes
- Clade: Angiosperms
- Clade: Eudicots
- Clade: Asterids
- Order: Lamiales
- Family: Plantaginaceae
- Genus: Veronica
- Species: V. leiophylla

Binomial name
- Veronica leiophylla Cheeseman

= Veronica leiophylla =

Species of flowering plant

Veronica leiophylla is a species of endemic shrub native to New Zealand.

== Description ==
Veronica leiophylla is a large hebe, which can grow up to 3 m (9.8 ft) in height. The leaves are opposite in pairs, and long and narrow. The margin of the leaves and the stems have very small hairs which can be seen with a hand lens. There is also a small or narrow sinus.

Veronica salicifolia has larger leaves.

The flowers are present during the second half of the austral summer.

== Distribution and habitat ==
Veronica leiophylla is known exclusively from the South Island of New Zealand. It is widespread. It grows either in scrubby areas, or at the edges of forests, and occasionally near water or in wet places. It can be found in river valleys. It prefers a temperate climate.

The species was originally described in the literature from specimens seen in Nelson, where it is plentiful.

There are some records in the south in Fiordland and near Dunedin, which may be unconfirmed.

== Ecology ==
A dark leafspot, Sensoria exotica sensu auct., can be hosted by Veronica leiophylla.

== Etymology ==
Leiophylla means 'smooth leaf' in Greek, although the leaves have hair on the edges.

== Taxonomy ==
Hebe gracillima has been subsumed into Veronica leiophylla, although they were initially described as two species.

== Cultivation ==
It is easy to cultivate.
