= Veronica rivalis =

Northland river koromiko

Scientific classification
- Kingdom: Plantae
- Clade: Tracheophytes
- Clade: Angiosperms
- Clade: Eudicots
- Clade: Asterids
- Order: Lamiales
- Family: Plantaginaceae
- Genus: Veronica
- Section: Veronica sect. Hebe
- Species: V. rivalis

Binomial name
- Veronica rivalis Garn.-Jones

Synonyms
- Hebe acutiflora Cockayne; Veronica acutiflora Benth., nom. illeg.; Veronica ligustrifolia var. acutiflora Hook.f.

Species of flowering plant

Veronica rivalis, synonym Hebe acutiflora, the Northland river koromiko, is a species of plant in the family Plantaginaceae. It is endemic to the north island of New Zealand.
