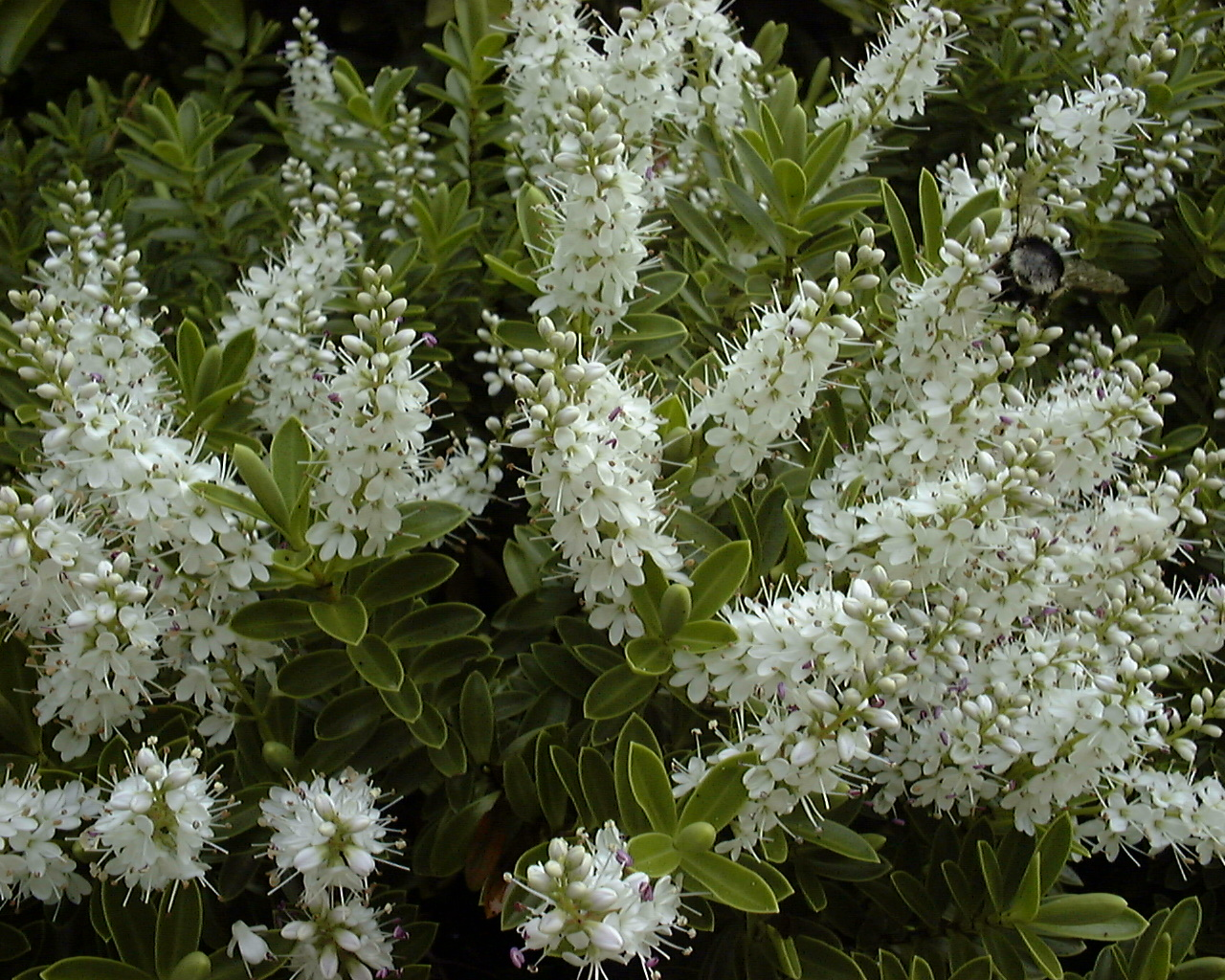
- In bloom

Scientific classification
- Kingdom: Plantae
- Clade: Tracheophytes
- Clade: Angiosperms
- Clade: Eudicots
- Clade: Asterids
- Order: Lamiales
- Family: Plantaginaceae
- Genus: Veronica
- Section: Veronica sect. Hebe
- Species: V. rakaiensis

Binomial name
- Veronica rakaiensis J.B.Armstr.

Synonyms
- Hebe rakaiensis (J.B.Armstr.) A.Wall; Hebe scott-thomsonii Allan

= Veronica rakaiensis =

Species of flowering plant

Veronica rakaiensis, the Rakai hebe, is a species of flowering plant in the family Plantaginaceae, native to the South Island of New Zealand. As its synonym Hebe rakaiensis it has gained the Royal Horticultural Society's Award of Garden Merit.
