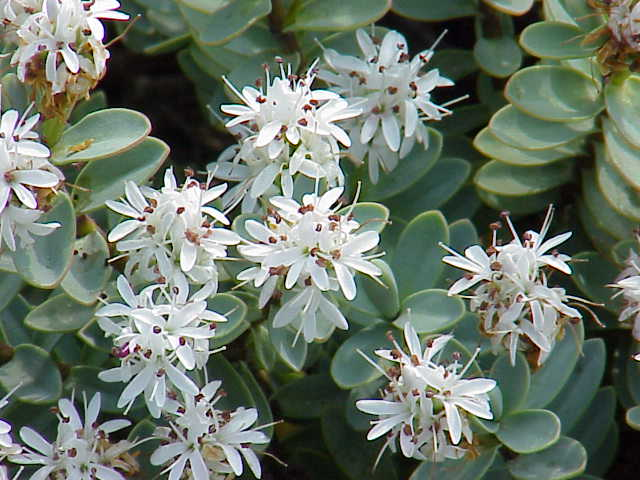
- In bloom

Scientific classification
- Kingdom: Plantae
- Clade: Tracheophytes
- Clade: Angiosperms
- Clade: Eudicots
- Clade: Asterids
- Order: Lamiales
- Family: Plantaginaceae
- Genus: Veronica
- Section: Veronica sect. Hebe
- Species: V. pinguifolia

Binomial name
- Veronica pinguifolia Hook.f.

Synonyms
- Hebe godefroyana (Carrière) Cockayne; Hebe pinguifolia (Hook.f.) Cockayne & Allan; Veronica godefroyana Carrière; Veronica pageana Hadden

= Veronica pinguifolia =

Species of flowering plant

Veronica pinguifolia, the disk-leaved hebe or thick-leaved speedwell, is a species of flowering plant in the family Plantaginaceae, native to the South Island of New Zealand. Under its synonym Hebe pinguifolia, its cultivar 'Pagei' has gained the Royal Horticultural Society's Award of Garden Merit.
