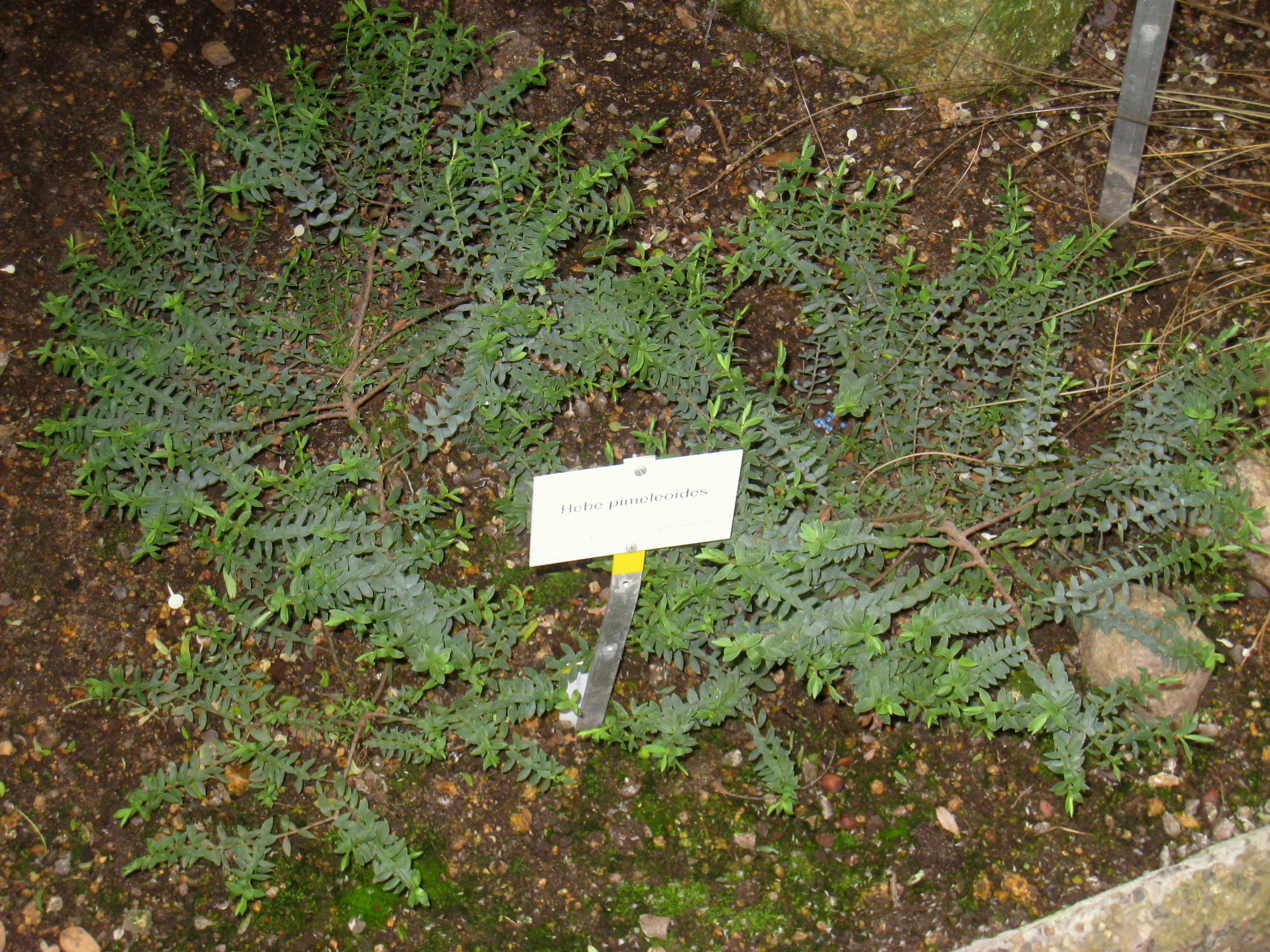

Scientific classification
- Kingdom: Plantae
- Clade: Tracheophytes
- Clade: Angiosperms
- Clade: Eudicots
- Clade: Asterids
- Order: Lamiales
- Family: Plantaginaceae
- Genus: Veronica
- Section: Veronica sect. Hebe
- Species: V. pimeleoides

Binomial name
- Veronica pimeleoides Hook.f.

Synonyms
- Hebe pimeleoides (Hook.f.) Cockayne & Allan

= Veronica pimeleoides =

Species of flowering plant in the plantain family

Veronica pimeleoides, synonym Hebe pimeleoides, is a flowering plant of the family Plantaginaceae. It is endemic to the dry mountains of Marlborough and Canterbury, in South Island of New Zealand. It is a low-growing, evergreen shrub, reaching 60 cm (24 in) in height, with grey-green, spear-shaped leaves that are 7–10 mm long. Flowers are pale lilac.

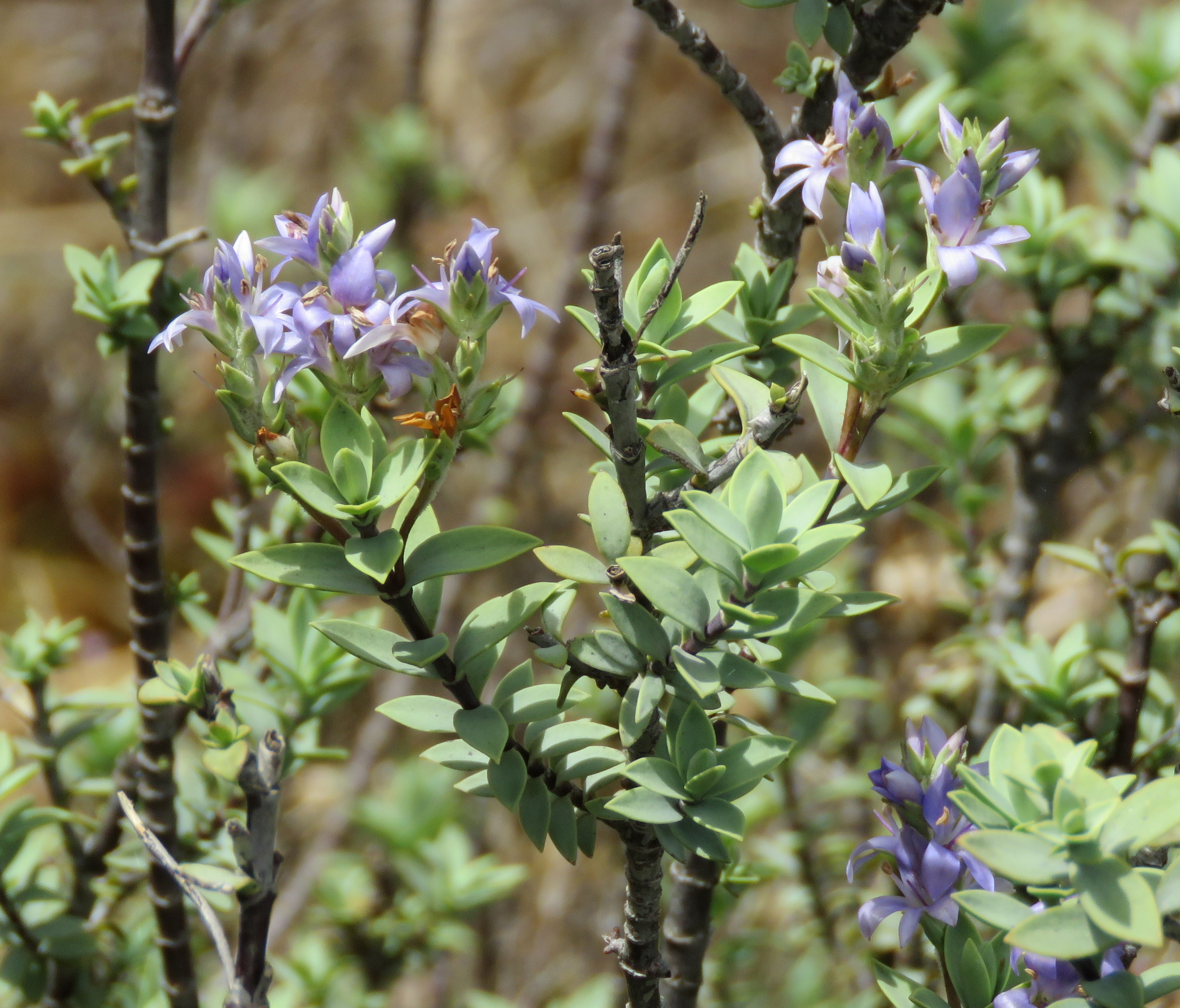
Flowering Veronica pimeleoides subsp. faucicola growing in its native range at Butchers Dam, Central Otago

The compact cultivar 'Quicksilver', with blue/grey leaves and white flowers, is a recipient of the Royal Horticultural Society's Award of Garden Merit. Hardy down to −5 °C (23 °F), it requires a sheltered position in full sun or partial shade.
