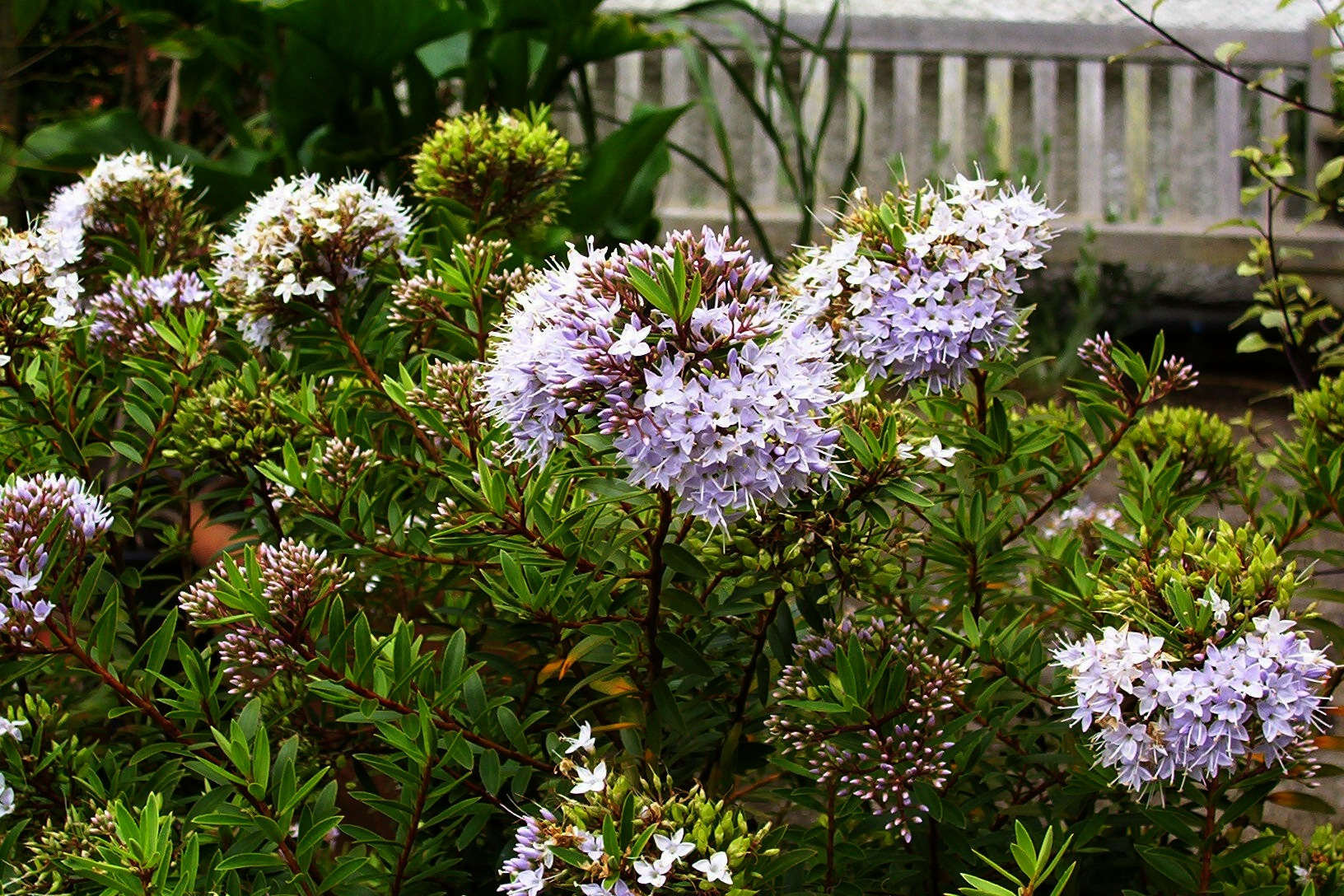

Scientific classification
- Kingdom: Plantae
- Clade: Tracheophytes
- Clade: Angiosperms
- Clade: Eudicots
- Clade: Asterids
- Order: Lamiales
- Family: Plantaginaceae
- Genus: Veronica
- Section: Veronica sect. Hebe
- Species: V. diosmifolia

Binomial name
- Veronica diosmifolia A.Cunn.

Synonyms
- Hebe diosmifolia (A.Cunn.) Andersen; Hebe trisepala (Colenso) Cockayne; Veronica trisepala Colenso

= Veronica diosmifolia =

Species of flowering plant in the plantain family

Veronica diosmifolia, synonym Hebe diosmifolia, is a flowering plant of the family Plantaginaceae, endemic to New Zealand.
