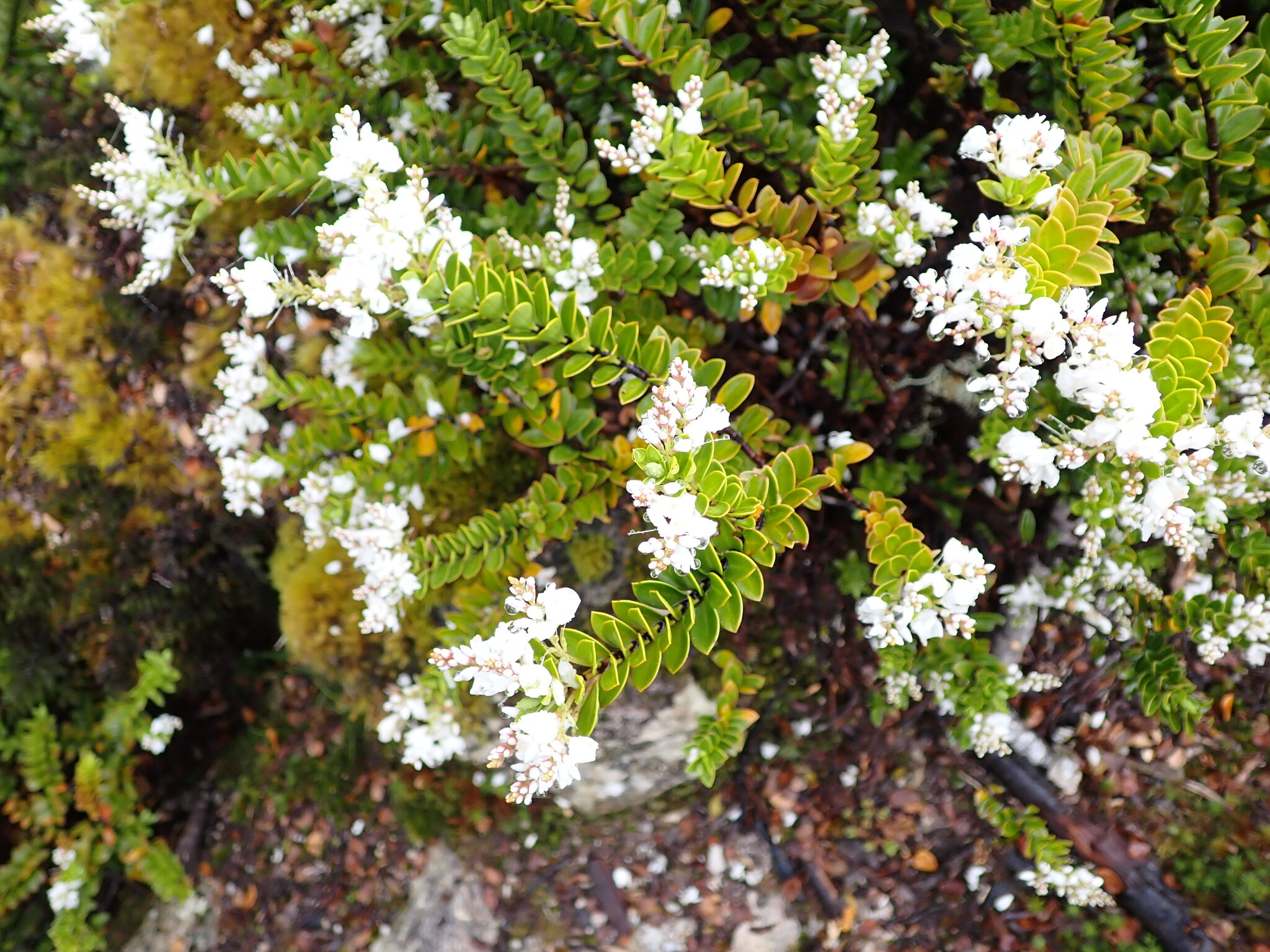
- Veronica vernicosa growing wild on the Gibbs Spur, Tasman District

Scientific classification
- Kingdom: Plantae
- Clade: Tracheophytes
- Clade: Angiosperms
- Clade: Eudicots
- Clade: Asterids
- Order: Lamiales
- Family: Plantaginaceae
- Genus: Veronica
- Section: Veronica sect. Hebe
- Species: V. vernicosa

Binomial name
- Veronica vernicosa Hook.f.

Synonyms
- Hebe greyi (J.B.Armstr.) Cockayne; Hebe vernicosa (Hook.f.) Cockayne & Allan; Veronica greyi J.B.Armstr.

= Veronica vernicosa =

Species of flowering plant

Veronica vernicosa, the varnished hebe, is a species of flowering plant in the family Plantaginaceae, native to the South Island of New Zealand. As its synonym Hebe vernicosa, it and its cultivar 'Mrs Winder' have both gained the Royal Horticultural Society's Award of Garden Merit.
