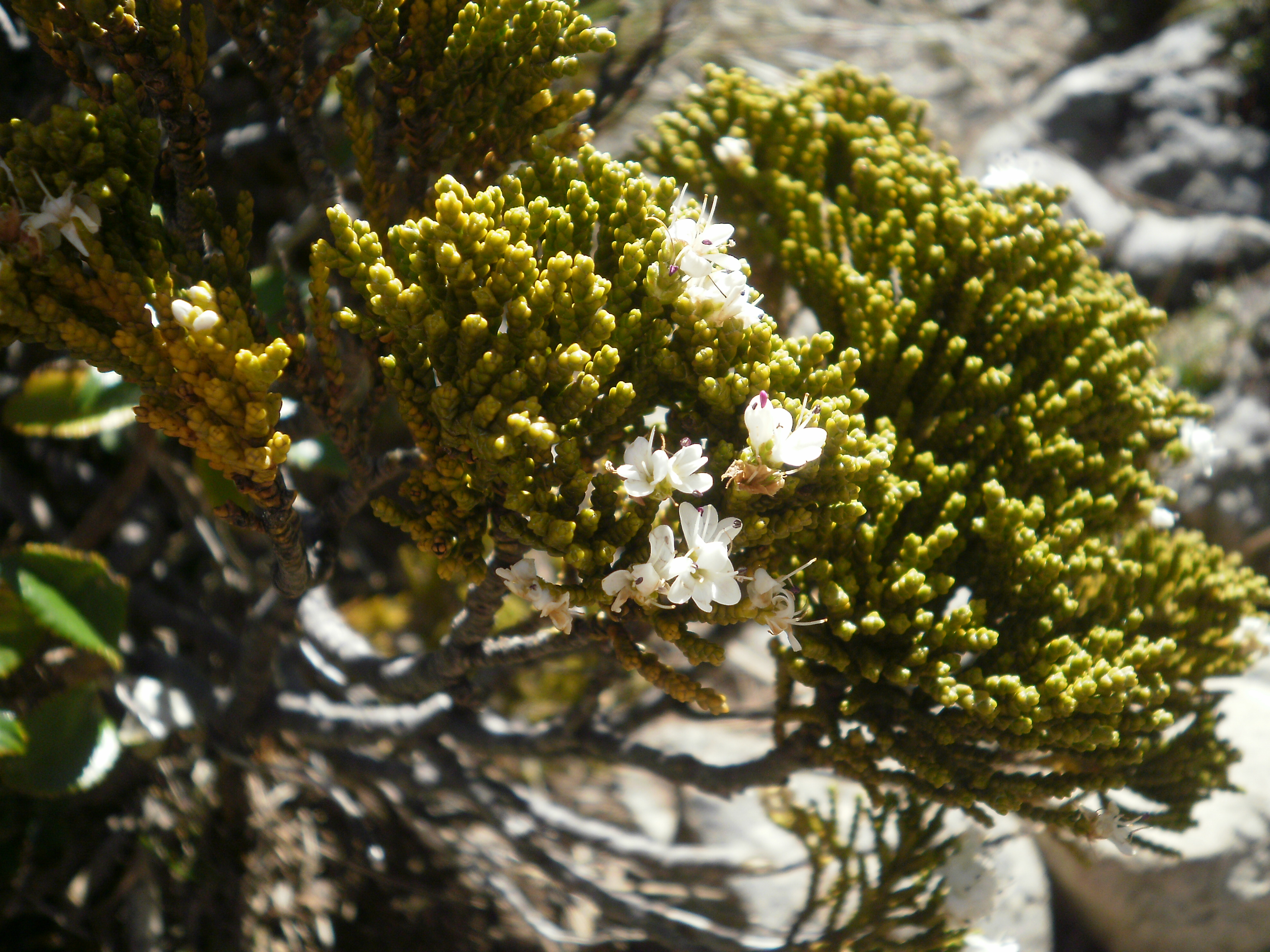

Scientific classification
- Kingdom: Plantae
- Clade: Tracheophytes
- Clade: Angiosperms
- Clade: Eudicots
- Clade: Asterids
- Order: Lamiales
- Family: Plantaginaceae
- Genus: Veronica
- Section: Veronica sect. Hebe
- Species: V. tetragona

Binomial name
- Veronica tetragona Hook.

Synonyms
- Hebe tetragona (Hook.) Andersen; Of subsp. similis: Hebe astonii (Petrie) Cockayne & Allan; Hebe hectorii subsp. subsimilis (Colenso) Wagstaff & Wardle; Hebe subsimilis (Colenso) Ashwin, H.H.B.Allan; Hebe tetragona subsp. subsimilis (Colenso) Bayly & Kellow; Leonohebe subsimilis (Colenso) Heads; Leonohebe subsimilis var. astonii (Petrie) Heads; Veronica astonii Petrie; Veronica subsimilis Colenso; Of subsp. tetragona: Leonohebe tetragona (Hook.f.) Heads

= Veronica tetragona =

Species of flowering plant

Veronica tetragona, synonym Hebe tetragona, is a subalpine plant of the family Plantaginaceae, which is endemic to New Zealand.

Veronica tetragona can grow up to 1 metre high and has very small, yellow-green leaves that completely surround the stem. White flowers are produced during summer. The plant gets its name from its distinctive four-sided branches.

Two subspecies were accepted by Plants of the World Online, as of October 2022:

- Veronica tetragona subsp. subsimilis (Colenso) Garn.-Jones, syn. Veronica subsimilis – north island of New Zealand
- Veronica tetragona subsp. tetragona – throughout New Zealand
