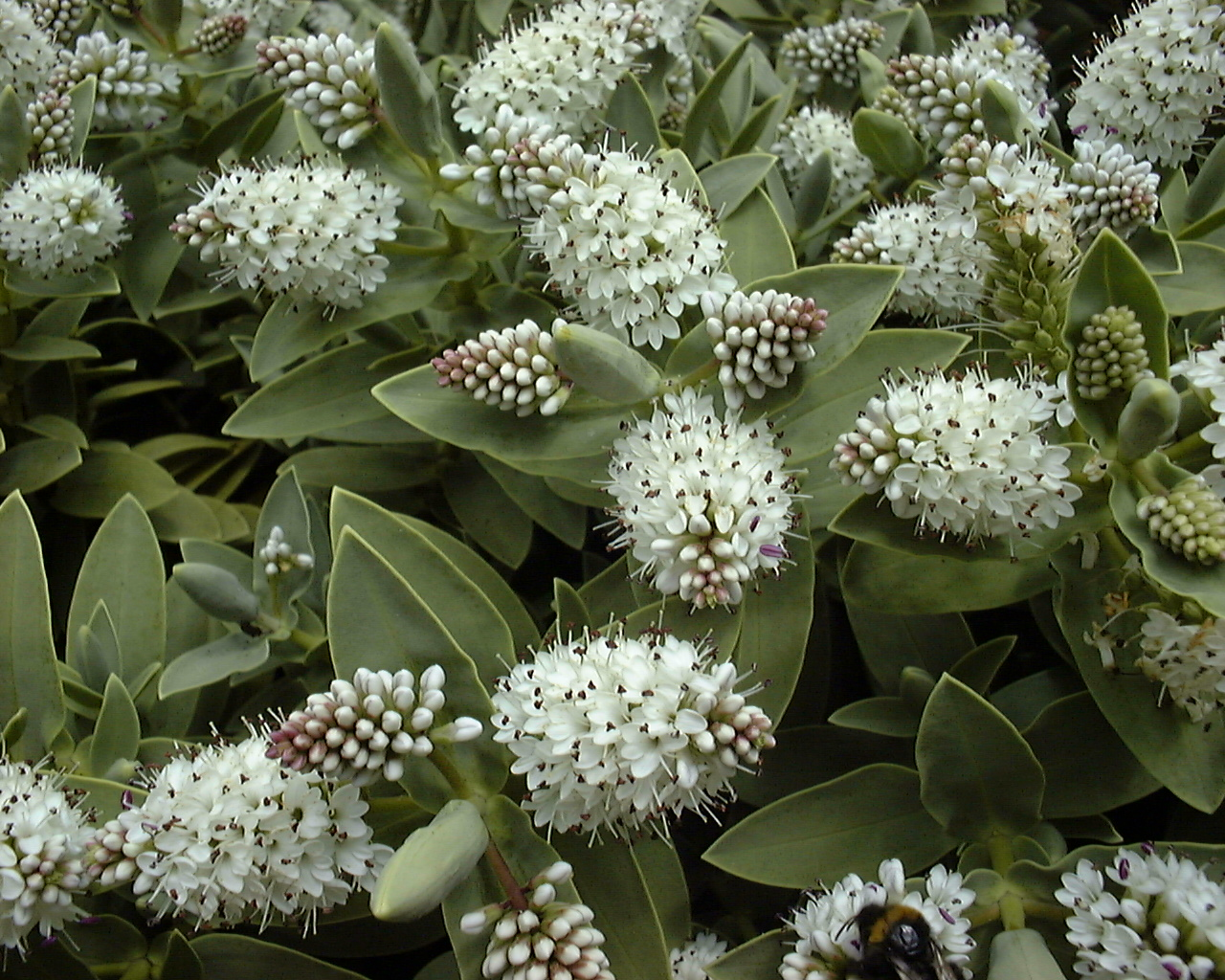

Scientific classification
- Kingdom: Plantae
- Clade: Tracheophytes
- Clade: Angiosperms
- Clade: Eudicots
- Clade: Asterids
- Order: Lamiales
- Family: Plantaginaceae
- Genus: Veronica
- Section: Veronica sect. Hebe
- Species: V. albicans

Binomial name
- Veronica albicans Petrie

Synonyms
- Hebe albicans (Petrie) Cockayne

= Veronica albicans =

Species of flowering plant

Veronica albicans, synonym Hebe albicans, is a species of flowering plant in the family Plantaginaceae, native to New Zealand.

== Description ==
Growing to 60 cm (24 in) tall by 90 cm (35 in) wide, it is an evergreen shrub with thick bluish leaves 1.5–3 cm (0.59–1.18 in) long and 8–15 mm (0.31–0.59 in) wide. The small white flowers, on flowerheads 3–6 centimetres (1.2–2.4 in) in length, appear from December to April. The Latin specific epithet albicans means "off-white", referring to the colour of the flowers.

== Distribution and habitat ==
V. albicans is found in the mountainous region around Nelson, New Zealand, at an altitude of 1,000–1,400 metres (3,300–4,600 ft). A closely related species, Veronica amplexicaulis, is found in a similar habitat in Canterbury.

This plant has gained the Royal Horticultural Society's Award of Garden Merit. Hardy down to −5 °C (23 °F), it requires a sheltered position in full sun or partial shade.
