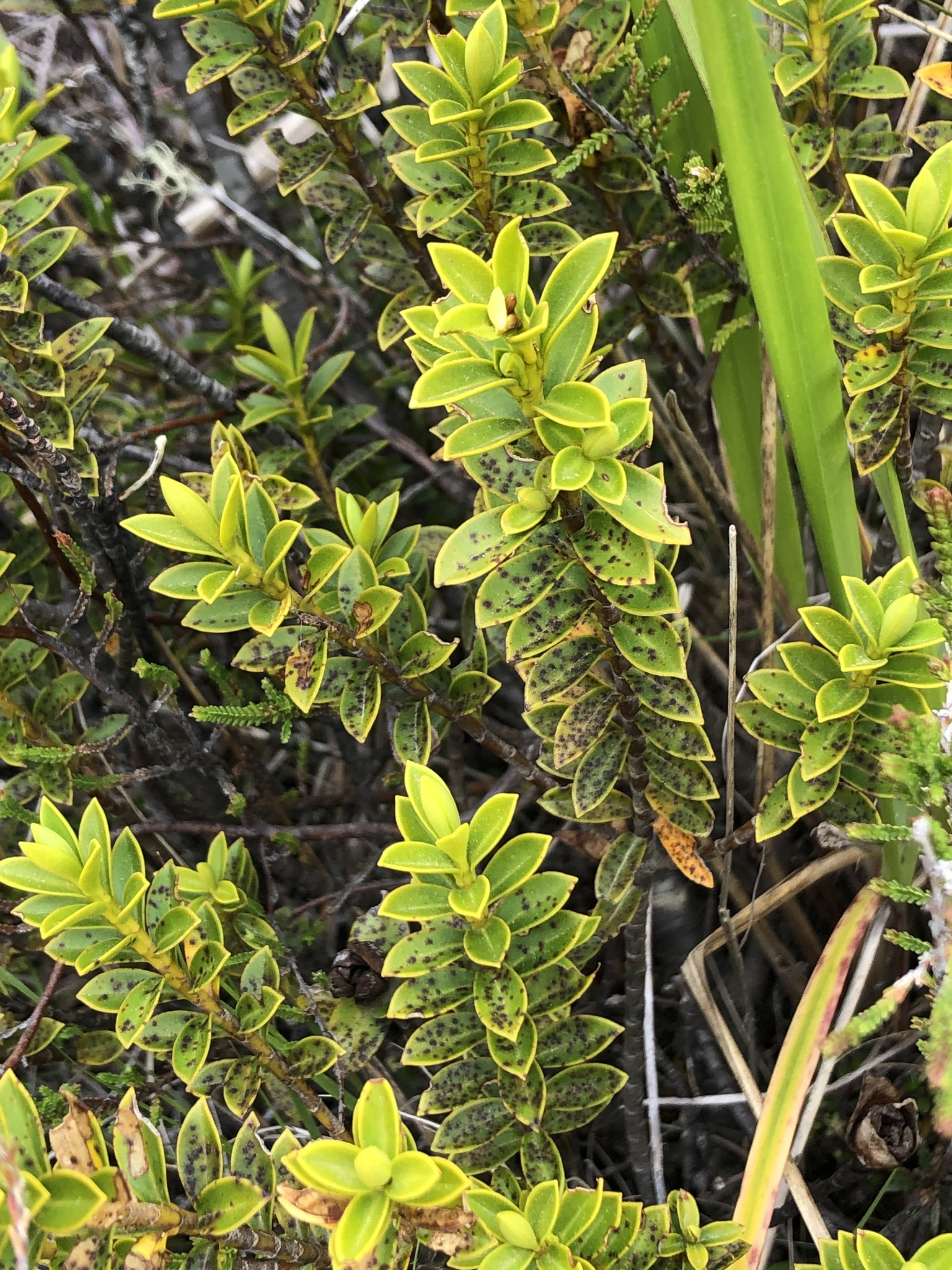
- Veronica venustula in Tongariro National Park

Conservation status
- Not Threatened (NZ TCS)

Scientific classification
- Kingdom: Plantae
- Clade: Tracheophytes
- Clade: Angiosperms
- Clade: Eudicots
- Clade: Asterids
- Order: Lamiales
- Family: Plantaginaceae
- Genus: Veronica
- Species: V. venustula

Binomial name
- Veronica venustula Colenso

= Veronica venustula =

Species of plant

Veronica venustula is a species of flowering plant.

== Description ==
A small bushy shrub with green leaves in the traditional veronica like-arrangement.

== Range ==
Subalpine environments in the North Island of New Zealand.
