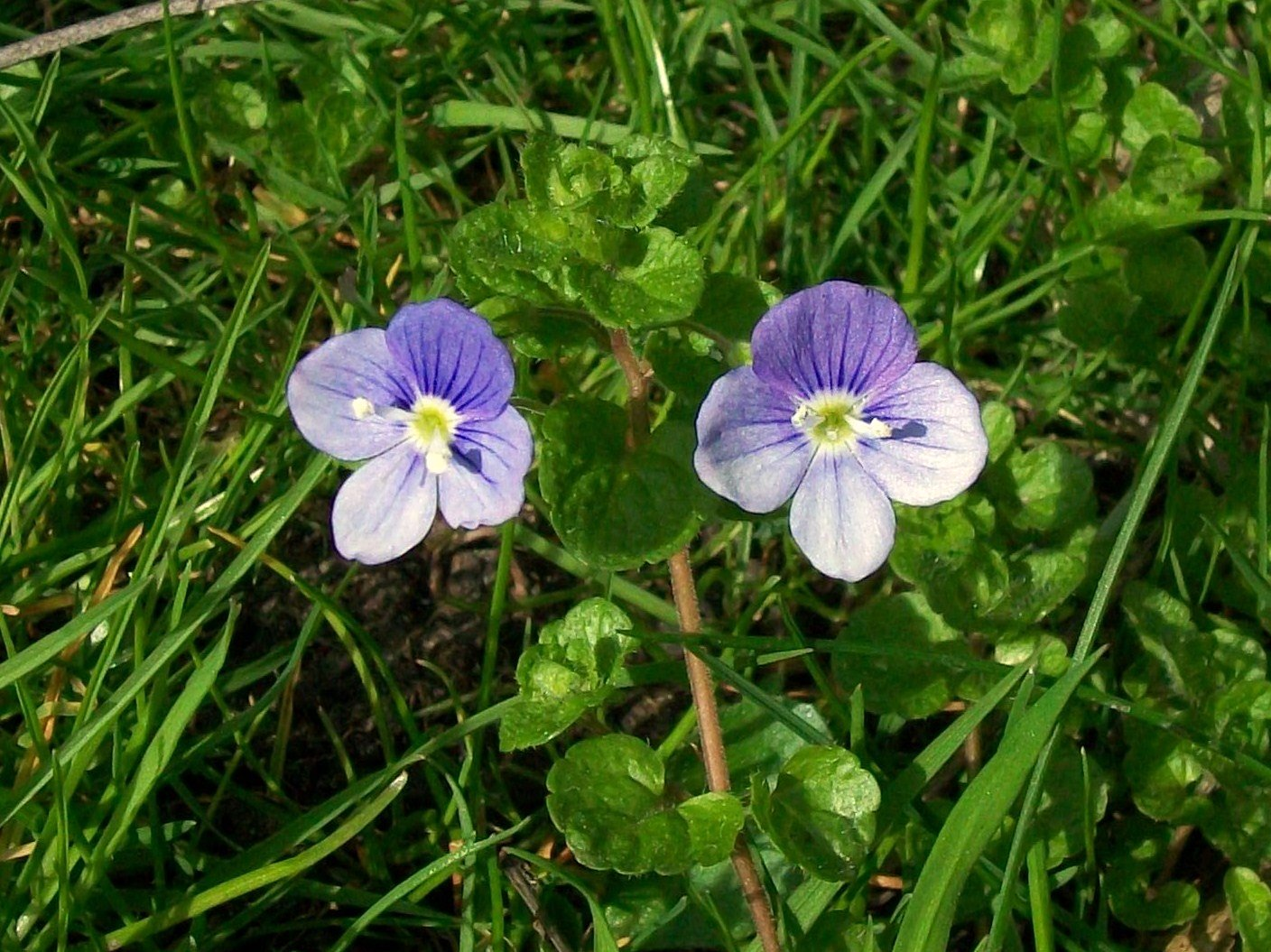

Scientific classification
- Kingdom: Plantae
- Clade: Tracheophytes
- Clade: Angiosperms
- Clade: Eudicots
- Clade: Asterids
- Order: Lamiales
- Family: Plantaginaceae
- Genus: Veronica
- Species: V. filiformis

Binomial name
- Veronica filiformis Sm.

Synonyms
- Veronica sibthorpiifolia

= Veronica filiformis =

Species of flowering plant

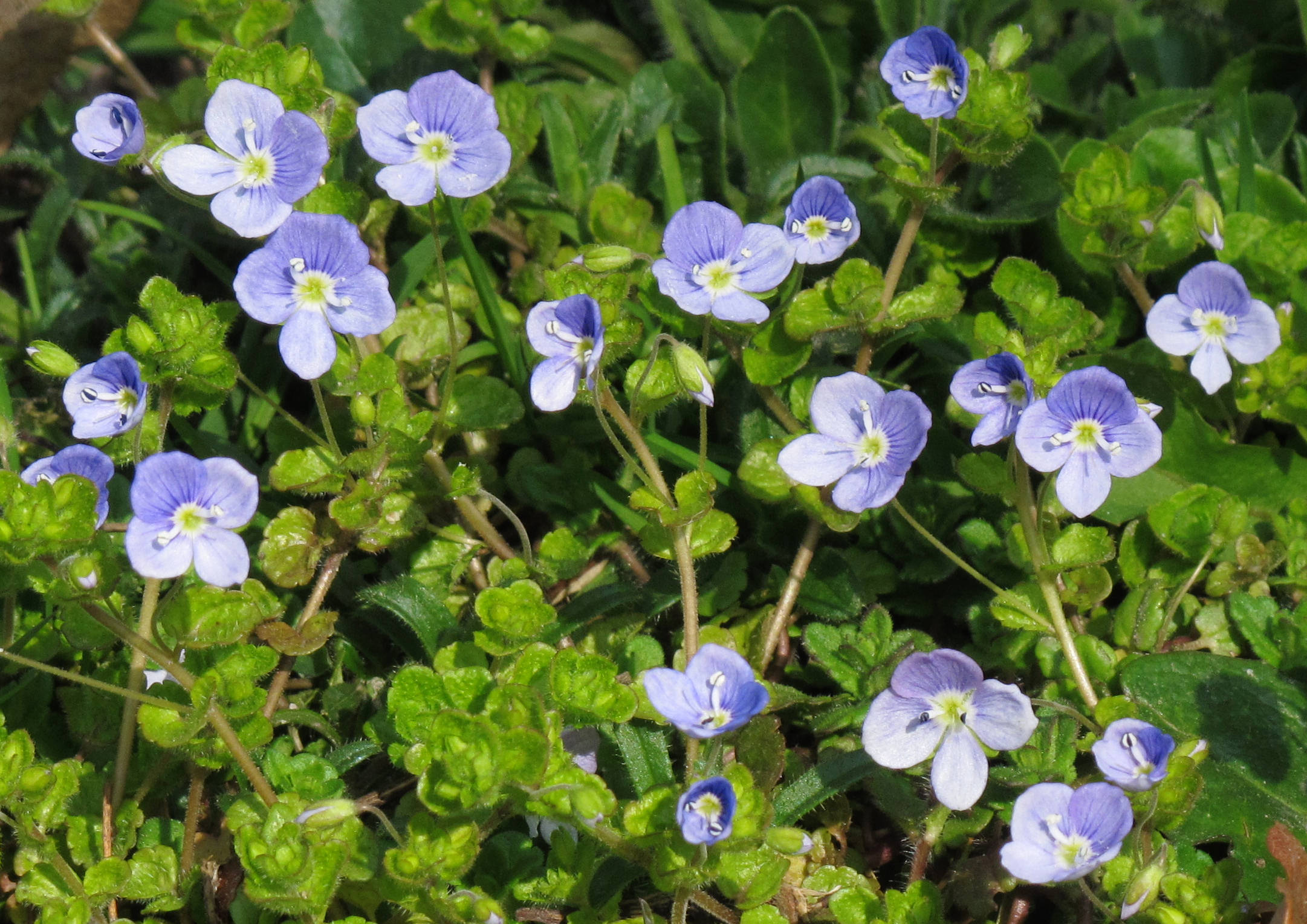
Typical spreading form

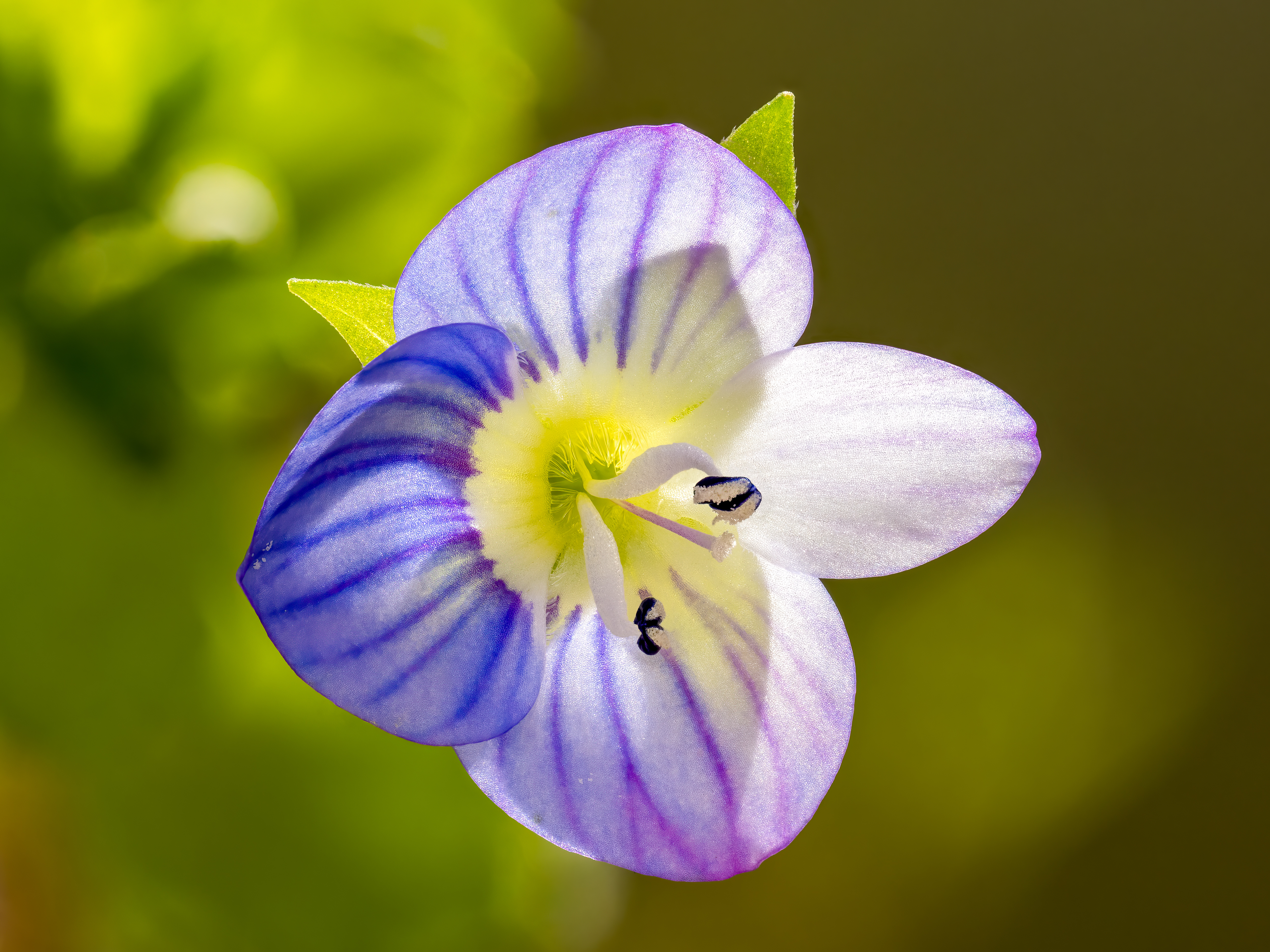
Veronica filiformis flower

Veronica filiformis is a species of flowering plant in the family Plantaginaceae. It is known by many common names, including slender speedwell, creeping speedwell, threadstalk speedwell and Whetzel weed. It is native to eastern Europe and western Asia, and it is known in many other regions as an introduced species.

== Description ==
Veronica filiformis is a rhizomatous perennial herb producing mats of stems that readily root at nodes that touch substrate. It is self-sterile and rarely seeds, being spread by stolons. The stems can reach lengths of 5 to 50 centimeters (2 to 20 in) and be hairy without glands to covered in glandular hairs.

The corolla of V. filiformis is four-lobed and bluish with a white tip, around 8–10 mm in diameter, the top lobe being largest since it is actually a fusion of two lobes. At the center are two long, protruding stamens. Solitary flowers occur in leaf axils. They are on relatively long, slender stalks that arise from the leaf axils, and appear between April and July. The leaves, found near the base of the stem, are 5–10 mm across, rounded or kidney-shaped with blunt teeth and short stalks, and smaller on distal parts. It is perennial. In Ireland, the plant was sewn into the clothing of travellers for good luck.

== Taxonomy ==
Veronica filiformis was given its scientific name by James Edward Smith in 1791. It is classified in the genus Veronica within the family Plantaginaceae. It has one botanical synonym Veronica sibthorpiifolia described by Louis Athanase Chaubard in 1853. It has no subspecies.

== Status and habitat ==
A native to northern Turkey and the Caucasus, V. filiformis was introduced to the United Kingdom from Turkey in 1808 as a rock garden plant and was first reported as an escape in 1838. It was introduced to the United States nursery trade in the 1920s. It can sometimes be considered a nuisance in lawns, sod, and turf. It is found in gardens, grassy paths and in meadows, where it prefers shade, moist soils, good fertility and a low mowing height.

It reproduces asexually by resprouting from separated sections of stem and rhizome and easily takes hold in new habitat. The plant is used as groundcover in gardens, and valued for its pretty blue flowers, but it is easily dispersed into the environment if it is chopped up, during mowing, for example. It is still cultivated, sold, and used in gardening.

== Identification ==
V. filiformis is similar to other Veronica species, such as V. arvensis and V. chamaedrys, but can be distinguished by the size of its leaves and lack of seed capsules. The smallness of the leaves (smaller than the flower or of similar size and rather round in shape) and carpeting habit also generally distinguish it from similar species such as Veronica persica, Veronica polita, Veronica agrestis and Veronica ceratocarpa.

== Common names ==
V. filiformis is known by the following common names:

- Slender speedwell
- Creeping speedwell
- Threadstalk speedwell
- Caucasian speedwell
- Round-leaved speedwell
- Creeping Veronica
- Whetzel weed
