= Veronica cymbalariifolia =

Veronica cymbalariifolia is a botanical synonym of three species of plant:

- Veronica cymbalaria, synonym published in 1804 by Martin Vahl
- Veronica hederifolia, synonym published in 1772 by Johann Friedrich Gmelin
- Veronica persica, synonym published in 1793 by Franz Wilibald Schmidt
