= Birdeye speedwell =

Birdeye speedwell or bird's eye speedwell is a common name for several plants and may refer to:

- Veronica chamaedrys
- Veronica persica, native to Eurasia
