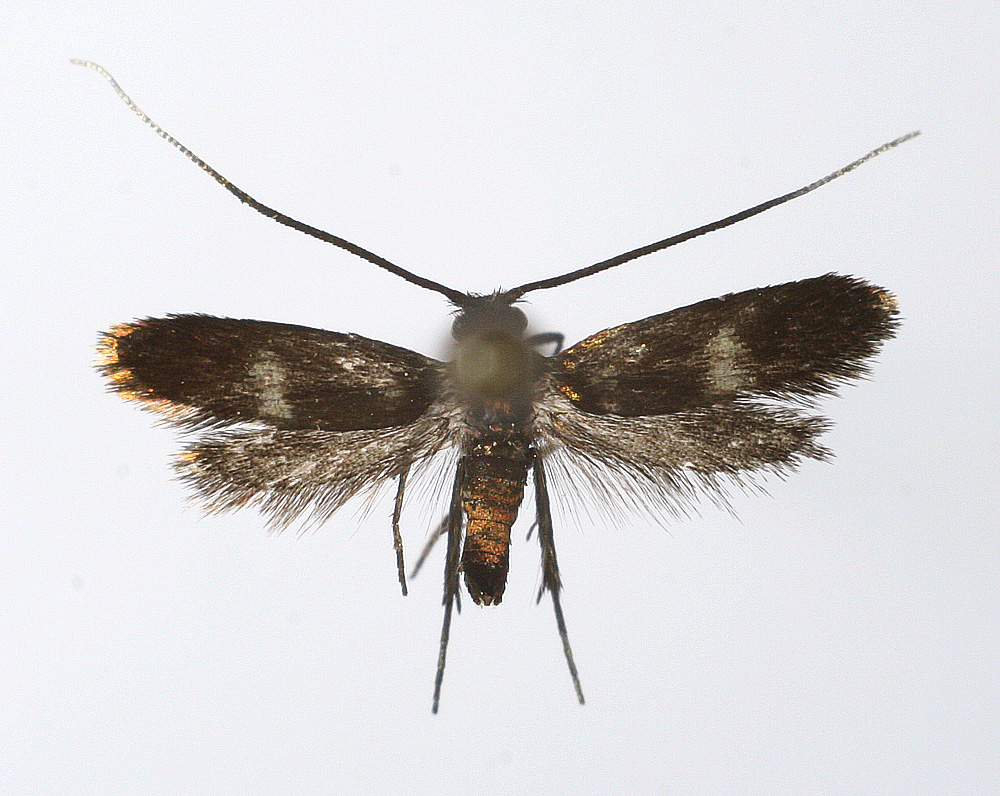

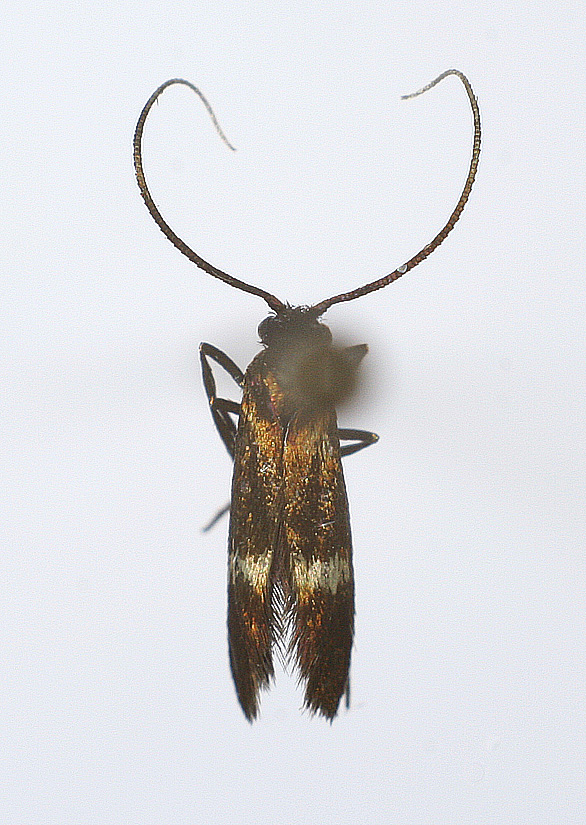

Scientific classification
- Kingdom: Animalia
- Phylum: Arthropoda
- Class: Insecta
- Order: Lepidoptera
- Family: Adelidae
- Genus: Cauchas
- Species: C. fibulella

Binomial name
- Cauchas fibulella (Denis & Schiffermüller, 1775)

Synonyms
- Tinea fibulella Denis & Schiffermuller, 1775; Adela fibulella; Tinea exiguella Denis & Schiffermuller, 1775

= Cauchas fibulella =

Species of moth

Cauchas fibulella is a day-active moth of the Adelidae family. It is known from most of Europe, although there are no records from Portugal, Ireland, Iceland, most of the Balkans, Belarus, southern Russia and the Mediterranean Islands.

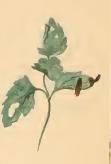
A sprig of Veronica chamaedrys with larva cases

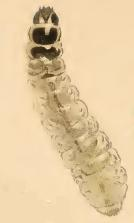
Larva

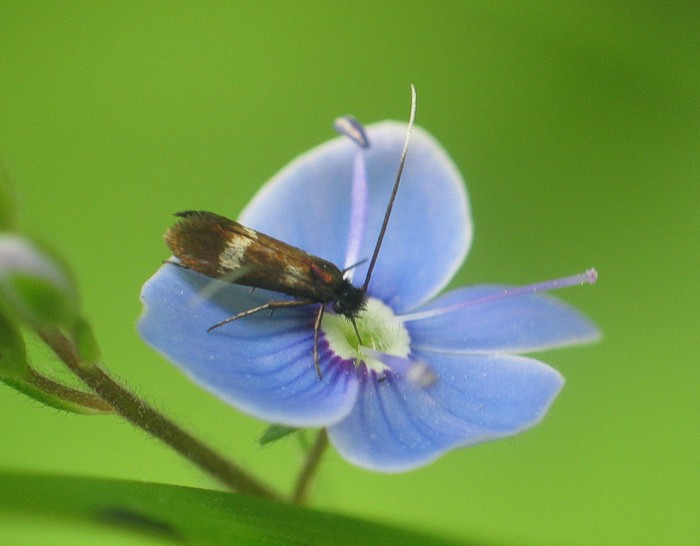
Adult

The wingspan is 8–8.5 mm for males and 7.9–8.6 for females. Adults are on wing from May to June.

The larvae feed on Veronica chamaedrys and Veronica officinalis.
