= Lower Wood =

Nature reserve in Cambridgeshire, England

Coordinates: 52.15°N 0.374°E

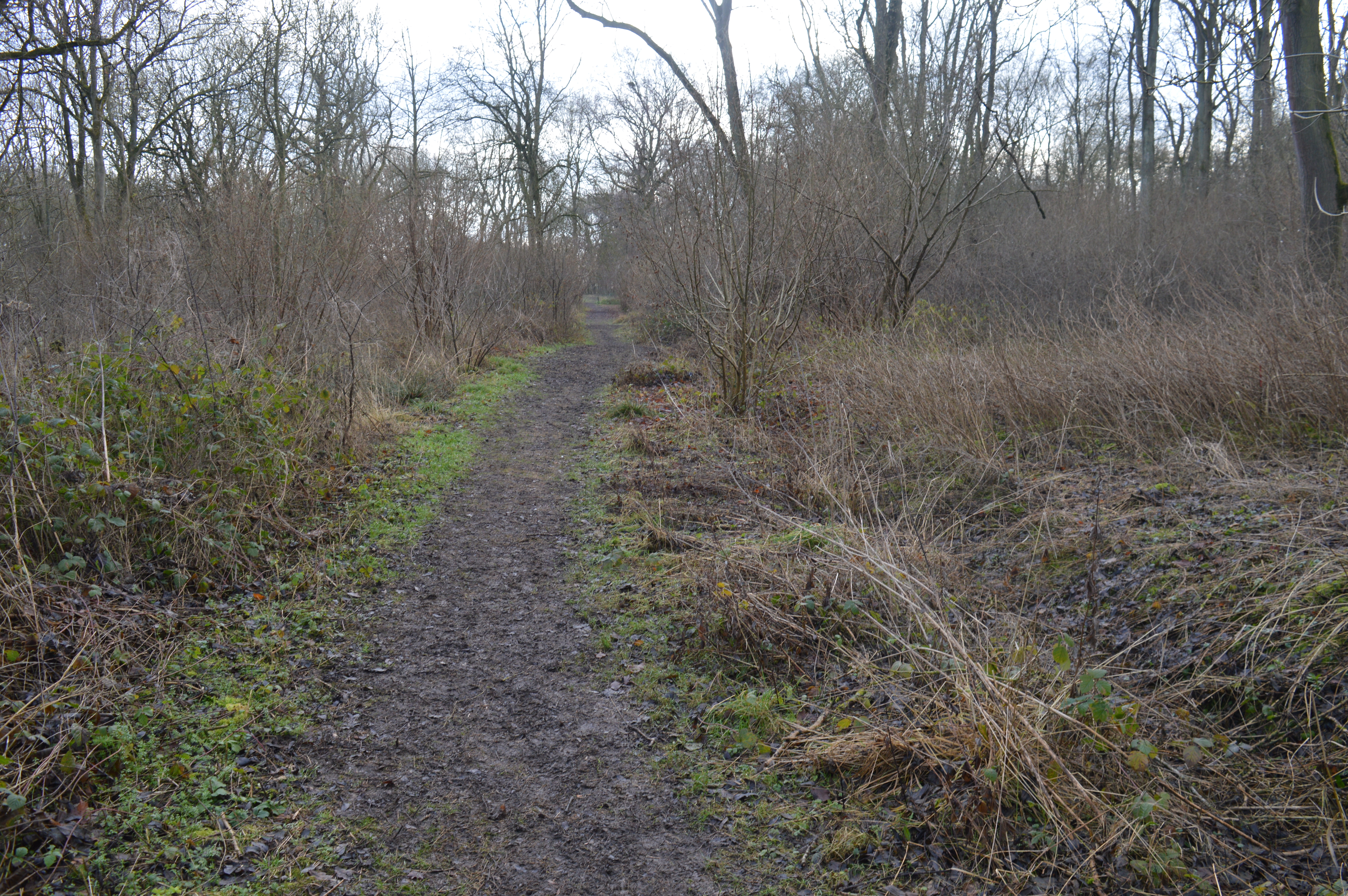
- Interactive map of Lower Wood
- Type: Nature reserve
- Location: Weston Colville, Cambridgeshire
- OS grid: TL625528
- Area: 9 hectares (22 acres)
- Manager: Wildlife Trust for Bedfordshire, Cambridgeshire and Northamptonshire

Lower Wood is a 9 hectare nature reserve east of Weston Colville in Cambridgeshire. It is managed by the Wildlife Trust for Bedfordshire, Cambridgeshire and Northamptonshire.

This ancient woodland has a variety of flora such as oxlips and early-purple orchids in the spring and water avens and germander speedwells in the summer. Muntjac and roe deer use the site and birds include goldcrests, great spotted woodpeckers and tawny owls.

There is access from a footpath along the eastern boundary.
