= Cauchas terskella =

Scientific classification
- Domain: Eukaryota
- Kingdom: Animalia
- Phylum: Arthropoda
- Class: Insecta
- Order: Lepidoptera
- Family: Adelidae
- Genus: Cauchas
- Species: C. terskella

Binomial name
- Cauchas terskella Kuprijanov, 1994

Species of moth

Cauchas terskella is a moth of the Adelidae family or fairy longhorn moths. It was described by Kuprijanov in 1994. It is found in south-eastern Kazakhstan.
