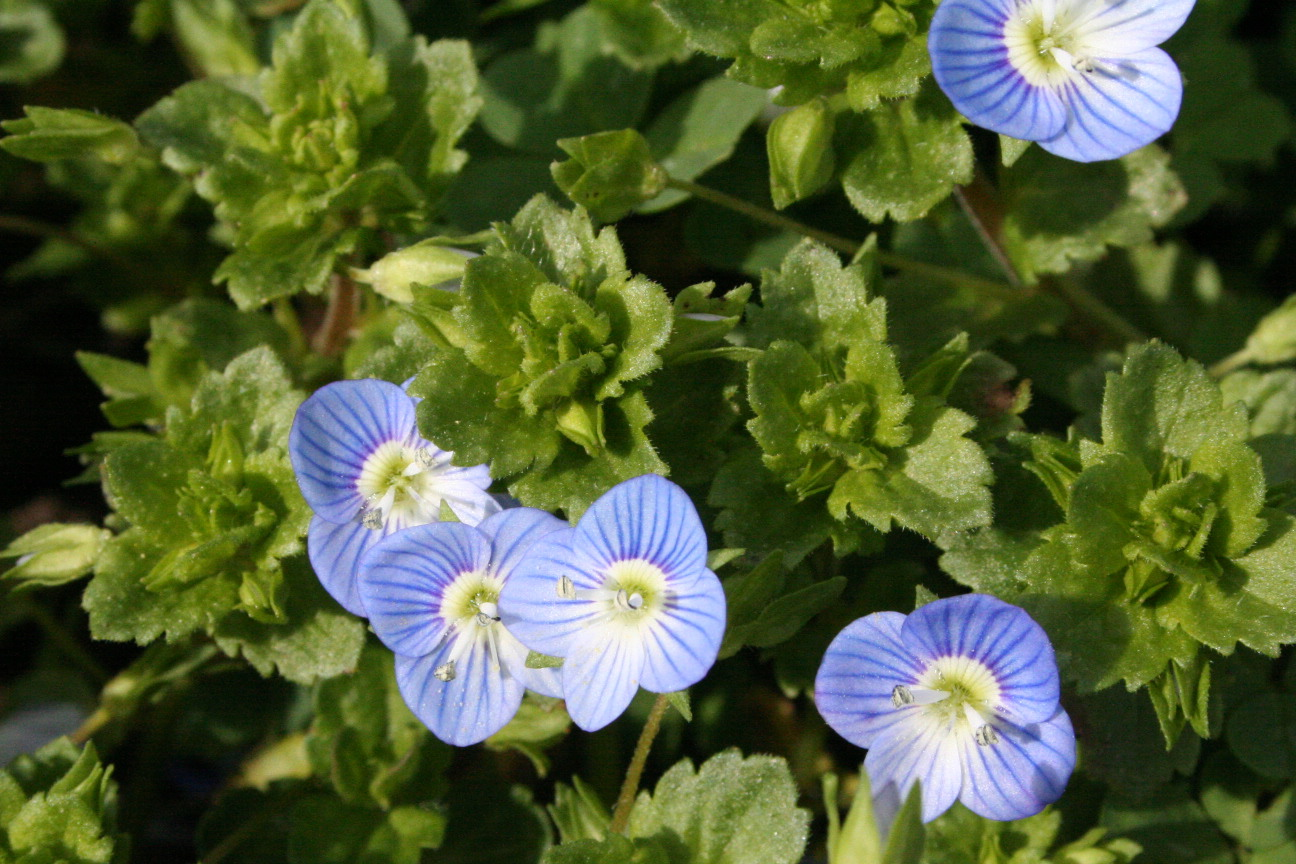

Scientific classification
- Kingdom: Plantae
- Clade: Tracheophytes
- Clade: Angiosperms
- Clade: Eudicots
- Clade: Asterids
- Order: Lamiales
- Family: Plantaginaceae
- Genus: Veronica
- Species: V. persica

Binomial name
- Veronica persica Poir.

Synonyms
- Pocilla persica (Poir.) Fourr.

= Veronica persica =

Plant species in the veronica family

Veronica persica is a flowering plant in the family Plantaginaceae. Common names include birdeye speedwell, common field-speedwell, Persian speedwell, large field speedwell, bird's-eye, or winter speedwell. The most widespread species of Veronica, it is native to western Asia but has been introduced worldwide.

== Description ==
Veronica persica is an annual that reproduces from seed.

Its cotyledons are triangular with truncated bases. The short-stalked leaves are broadly ovate with coarsely serrated margins, and measure one to two centimetres (0.4 to 0.8 in) long. The leaves are paired on the lower stem and are alternately arranged on the upper parts. The plant has weak stems that form a dense, prostrate groundcover. The tips of stems often grow upright.

The flowers are roughly one centimetre (0.4 in) wide and are sky-blue with dark stripes and white centers. They are zygomorphic, having only one vertical plane of symmetry. They are solitary on long, slender, hairy stalks in the leaf axils.

The seeds are transversely rugose and measure between one and two millimetres (0.04 and 0.08 in) long. There are five to 10 seeds per locule in the fruit.

Similar species include Veronica persica fruit, which have lobes that widely diverge to form a spreading 'V', and solitary flowers emerging from the stem with the leaf stalks, whilst the flower stalks are regularly much longer than the leaves. Other similar species include Veronica polita and Veronica agrestis (whose fruit lobes are parallel and flower stalks are shorter than or equal to the leaves), Veronica crista-galli (whose flowers and fruits are smaller than the calyx, and the calyx is formed of two bilobed parts not four unlobed parts), Veronica filiformis (whose small round leaves are smaller than or equal to the flowers, Veronica chamaedrys and Veronica montana (whose flowers are not solitary but form short unleafy spikes of flowers), and Veronica hederifolia (whose flowers are small and leaf lobing has a different appearance).

== Taxonomy ==
Veronica persica was given its scientific name in 1808 by the botanist Jean Louis Marie Poiret. It is classified in the genus veronica within the Plantaginaceae family. The spices is generally considered to be an allotetraploid species that arose via a hybridisation event. Based on morphological, cytological and chemical evidence, Fischer (1987) proposed that the species originated through hybridization between the diploid species Veronica polita and Veronica ceratocarpa, followed by genome duplication. The species has morphological traits which are intermediate between the traits of the two proposed ancestral species, including fruit size and sepal length. Its chromosome number (28) is double that of V. polita and V. ceratocarpa (14). This interpretation is cited elsewhere, but has not yet been fully confirmed using modern genomic data.

Veronica persica has several varieties among its 31 synonyms and also 13 species.

Table of Synonyms
Name	Year	Notes
Cardia filiformis Dulac	1867	= het.
Pocilla persica (Poir.) Fourr.	1869	≡ hom.
Veronica alpiphila Arv.-Touv.	1871	= het.
Veronica areolata Colenso	1891	= het.
Veronica buxbaumii Ten.	1811	= het., nom. illeg., homonym. post.
Veronica byzantina Britton, Sterns & Poggenb.	1888	= het.
Veronica cymbalariifolia F.W.Schmidt	1793	= het., nom. illeg., homonym. post.
Veronica diffusa Raf.	1838	= het.
Veronica filiformis DC.	1815	= het., nom. illeg., homonym. post.
Veronica hospita Mert. & W.D.J.Koch	1823	= het.
Veronica meskhetica Kem.-Nath.	1955	= het.
Veronica precox Raf.	1832	= het.
Veronica tournefortii C.C.Gmel.	1805	= het., nom. illeg., homonym. post.
Notes: ≡ homotypic synonym; = heterotypic synonym

== Distribution ==
Veronica persica is native to the Caucasus and northern Iran, but it has become widely naturalised elsewhere. It now has a near cosmopolitan distribution, having been introduced to Europe, North Africa, the Americas, East Asia, Australia and New Zealand.

The species was first recorded in Britain in 1825. It rapidly extended its range during the 1800s and was ubiquitous throughout lowland Britain and Ireland by 1960.

== Ecology ==
Veronica persica is a common ruderal and arable weed associated with disturbed habitats such as cultivated fields, gardens, lawns and roadsides. The plant prefers moist conditions and grows well in loamy, nutrient-rich soil. It is self-compatible and produces many seeds. It can germinate and flower throughout the year, and can spread vegetatively from stem fragments. These traits have contributed to the species' success outside its native range. Its seeds may be dispersed by ants.

== Horticultural uses ==
Although many species in the genus are used in gardens (such as V. exalta, V. incana, V. gentianoides, V. longifolia, V. perfoliata, and V. spicata), this species is generally seen as a weed and has no known horticultural uses.

== Herbal medicine ==
Afghani herbalist Mahomet Allum used the plant to treat patients with heart trouble, in Adelaide, Australia, in the mid-20th century. It is also used for snakebite treatment, hemorrhaging, rheumatoid arthritis, asthma, and as an expectorant.

== Gallery ==
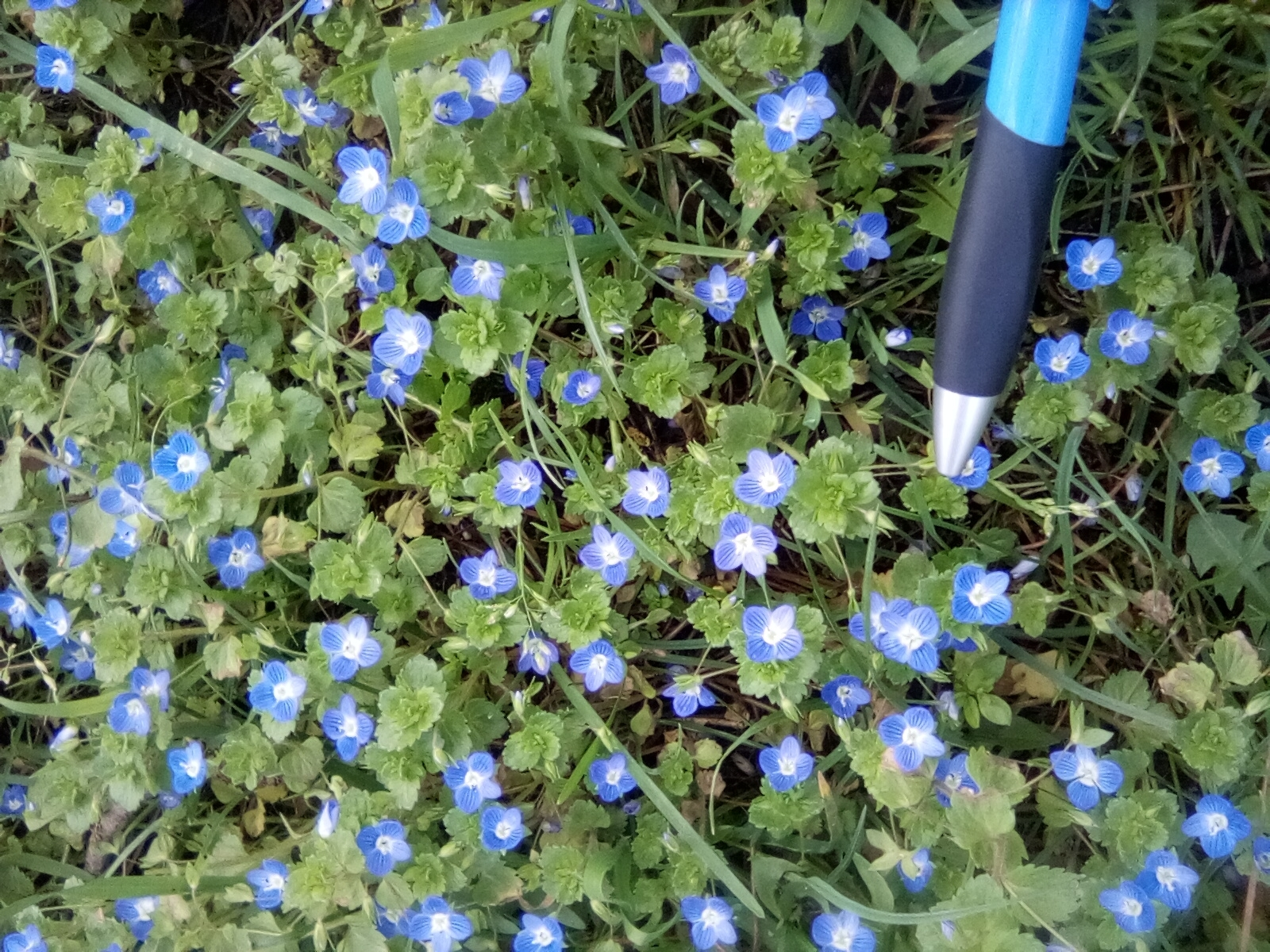

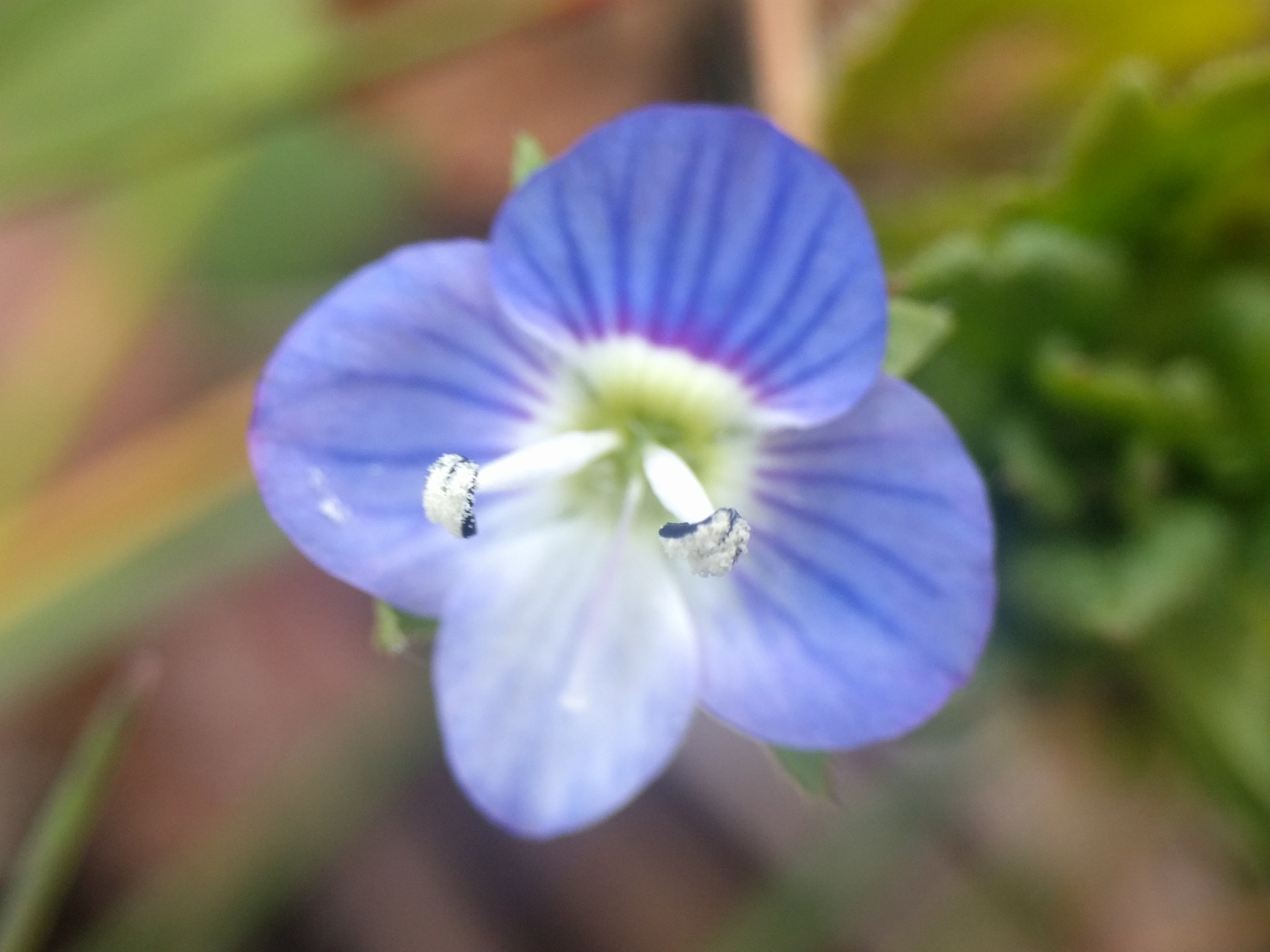

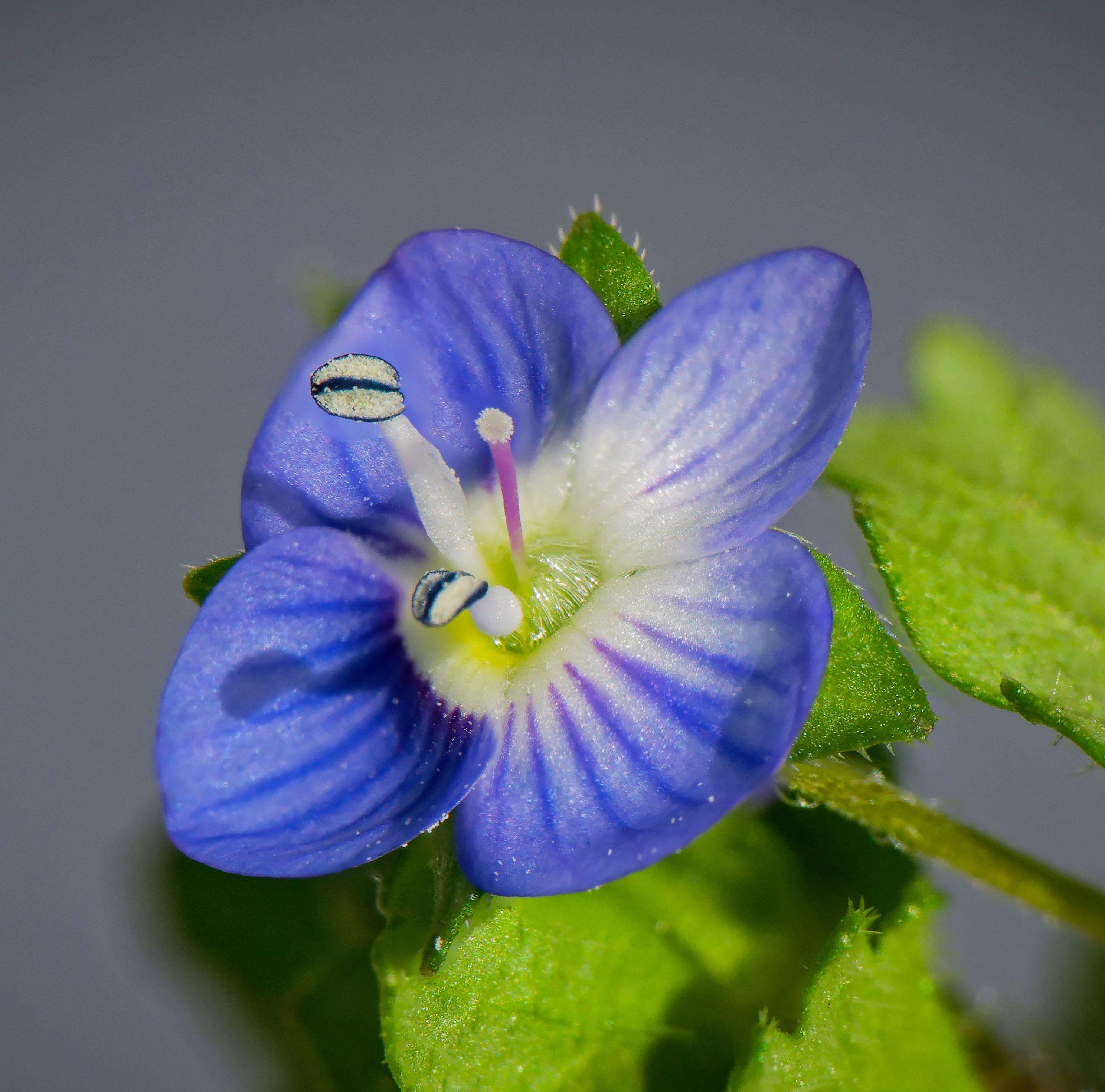

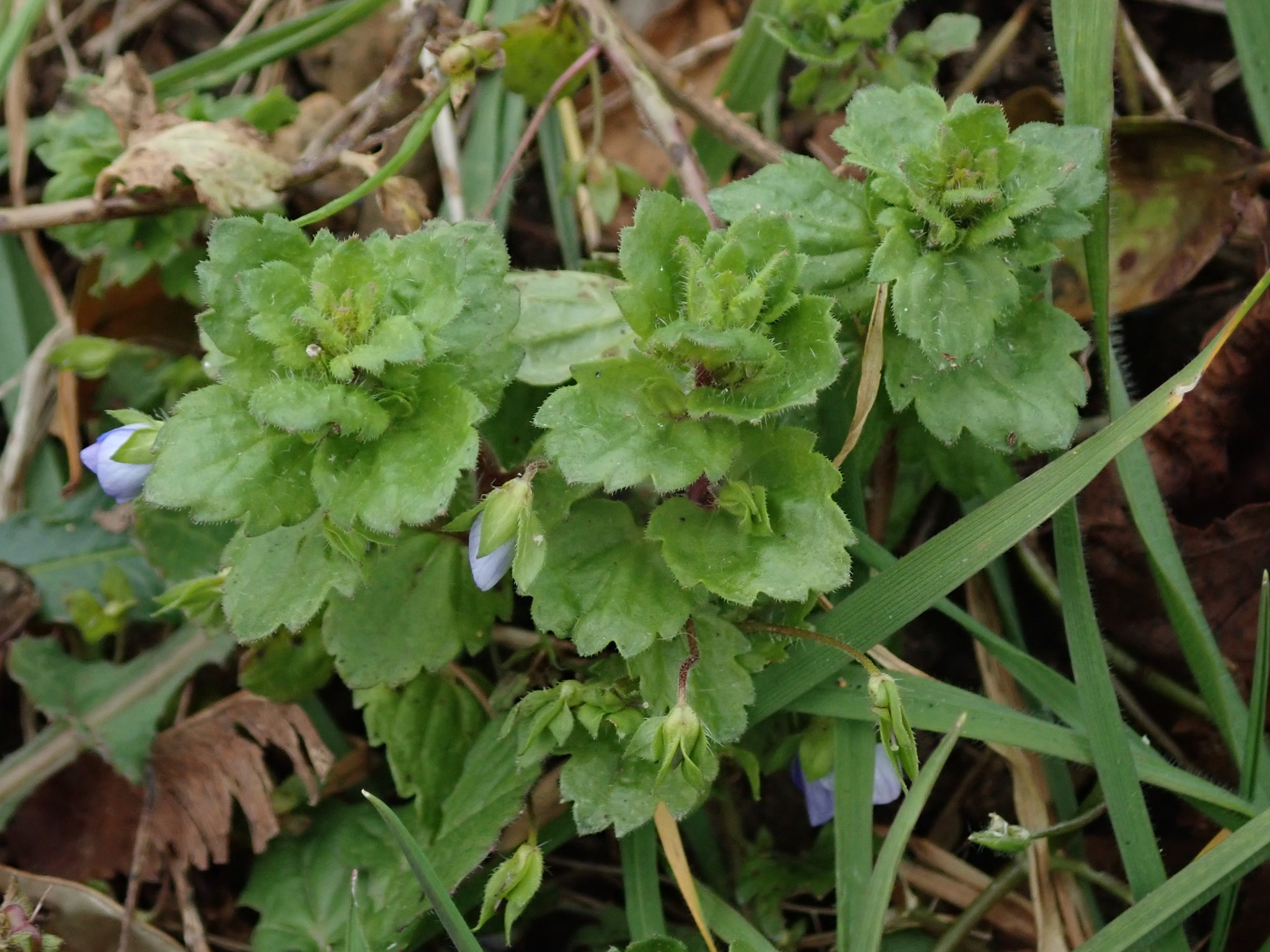

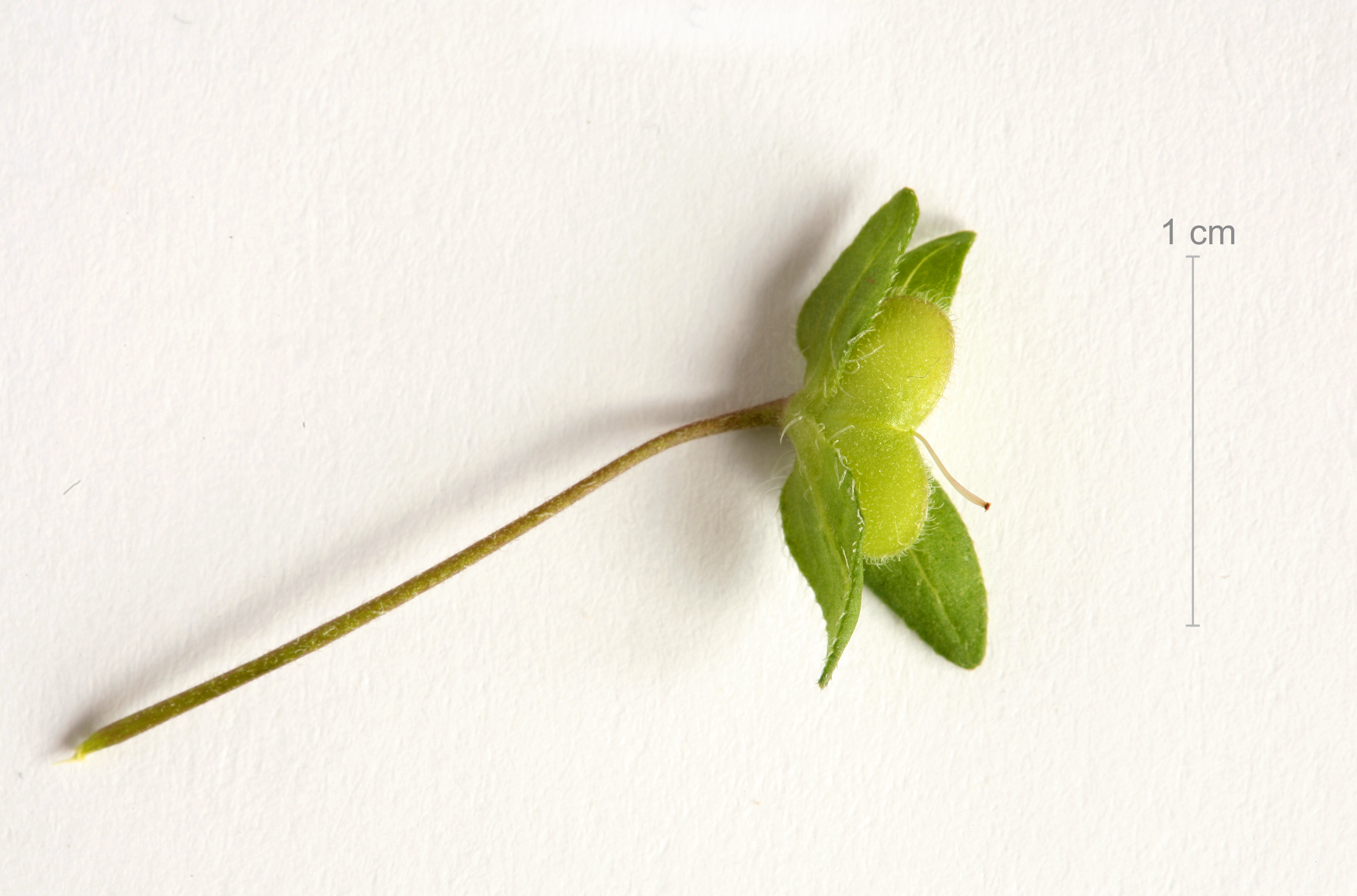
Unripe fruit showing lobes diverging to form a 'V'
