= Cauchas florella =

Scientific classification
- Kingdom: Animalia
- Phylum: Arthropoda
- Clade: Pancrustacea
- Class: Insecta
- Order: Lepidoptera
- Family: Adelidae
- Genus: Cauchas
- Species: C. florella

Binomial name
- Cauchas florella (Staudinger, 1871)

Synonyms
- Adela florella Staudinger, 1871

Species of moth

Cauchas florella is a moth of the Adelidae family. It is found in Russia and Turkey.
