= Veronica crista-galli =

Scientific classification
- Kingdom: Plantae
- Clade: Embryophytes
- Clade: Tracheophytes
- Clade: Spermatophytes
- Clade: Angiosperms
- Clade: Eudicots
- Clade: Asterids
- Order: Lamiales
- Family: Plantaginaceae
- Genus: Veronica
- Species: V. crista-galli

Binomial name
- Veronica crista-galli Steven

Species of flowering plant

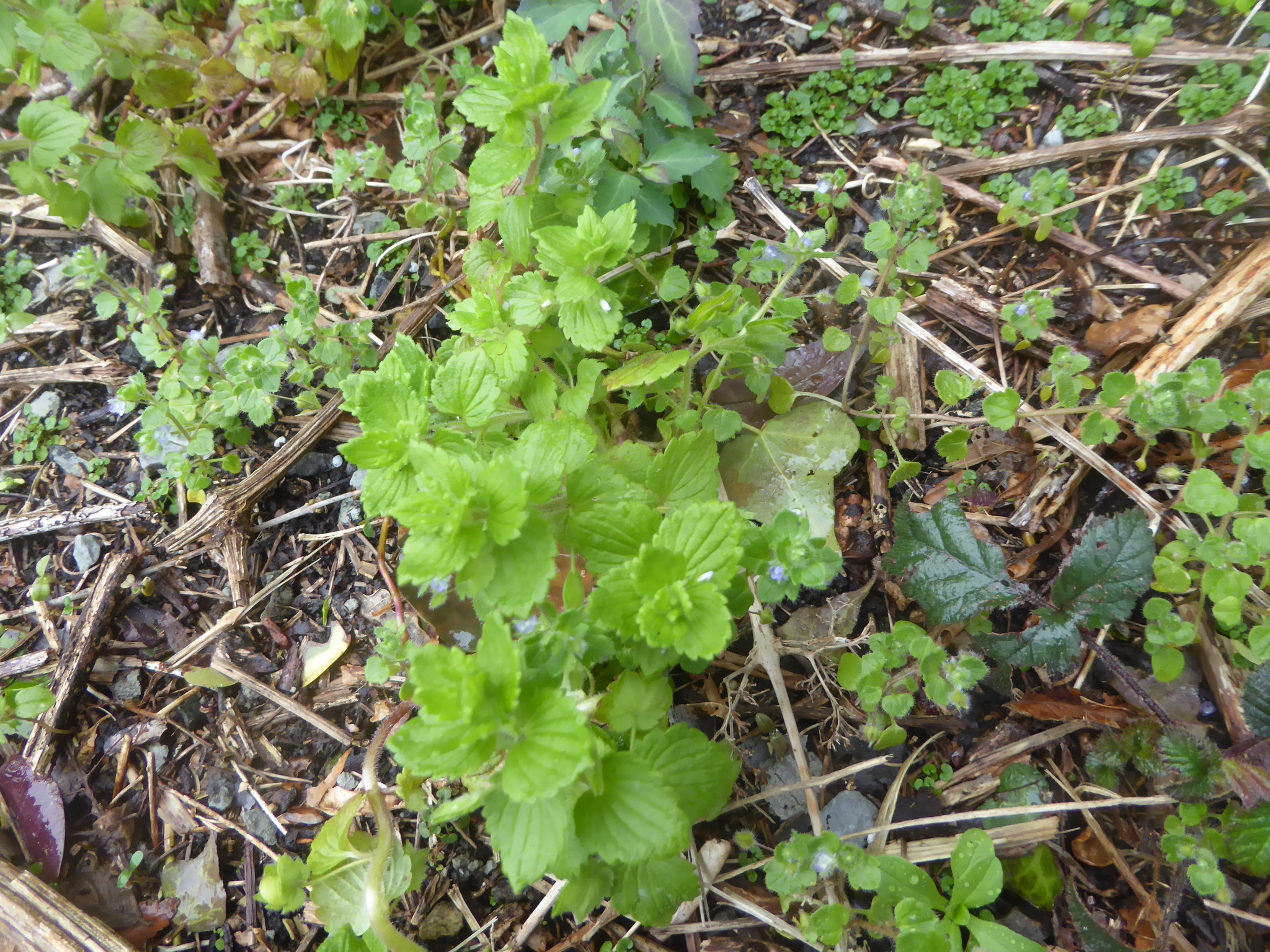
Crested Field-speedwell (Veronica crista-galli) in Ireland.

Veronica crista-galli, the crested field-speedwell, is an annual flower in the family Plantaginaceae native from Iran north to the North Caucasus.

== Description ==
An annual, bright blue flowered speedwell with a straggling habit to 50 cm (20 in), superficially resembling Veronica persica, with solitary flowers emerging from the stem with the leaf stalks, but its leaves have more numerous veins, flowers are shorter-stalked and smaller (generally smaller than the calyx it sits within), of a fairly uniform blue, and the calyx itself is formed of two, lobe-tipped parts, instead of the usual four unlobed parts; whilst the fruit when it matures is also concealed within the calyx rather than obvious, and has two parallel lobes, not divergent.

Photographic examples can be seen on iNaturalist.

== Distribution and habitat ==
Its native range is Iran, North Caucasus, Transcaucasus, and is introduced in the British Isles where it inhabits cultivated and rough ground and waste places.
