= Cauchas cockerelli =

Scientific classification
- Domain: Eukaryota
- Kingdom: Animalia
- Phylum: Arthropoda
- Class: Insecta
- Order: Lepidoptera
- Family: Adelidae
- Genus: Cauchas
- Species: C. cockerelli

Binomial name
- Cauchas cockerelli (Busck, 1915)

Synonyms
- Incurvaria cockerelli Busck, 1915; Chalceopla cockerelli

Species of moth

Cauchas cockerelli is a moth of the family Adelidae or fairy longhorn moths. The species was recorded by August Busck in 1915. It is generally found in North America, including Colorado.
