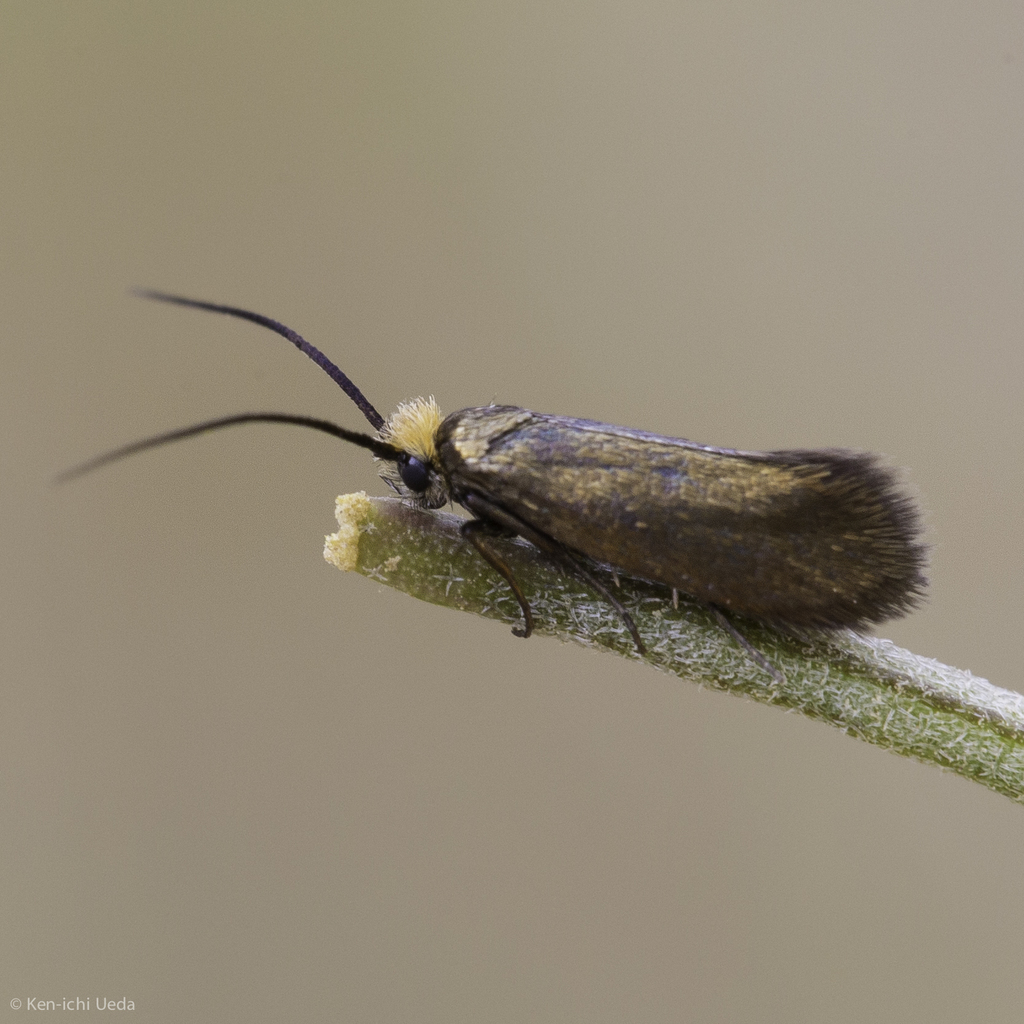

Scientific classification
- Kingdom: Animalia
- Phylum: Arthropoda
- Clade: Pancrustacea
- Class: Insecta
- Order: Lepidoptera
- Family: Adelidae
- Genus: Cauchas
- Species: C. simpliciella

Binomial name
- Cauchas simpliciella (Walsingham, 1880)

Synonyms
- Incurvaria simpliciella Walsingham, 1880; Chalceopla simpliciella; Chalceopla ovata Braun, 1912; Incurvaria itoniella Busck, 1915

= Cauchas simpliciella =

Species of moth

Cauchas simpliciella is a moth of the Adelidae family or fairy longhorn moths. It was described by Walsingham in 1880. It is found from Montana to the Pacific north-west of North America and south along the coast, including British Columbia and California.
