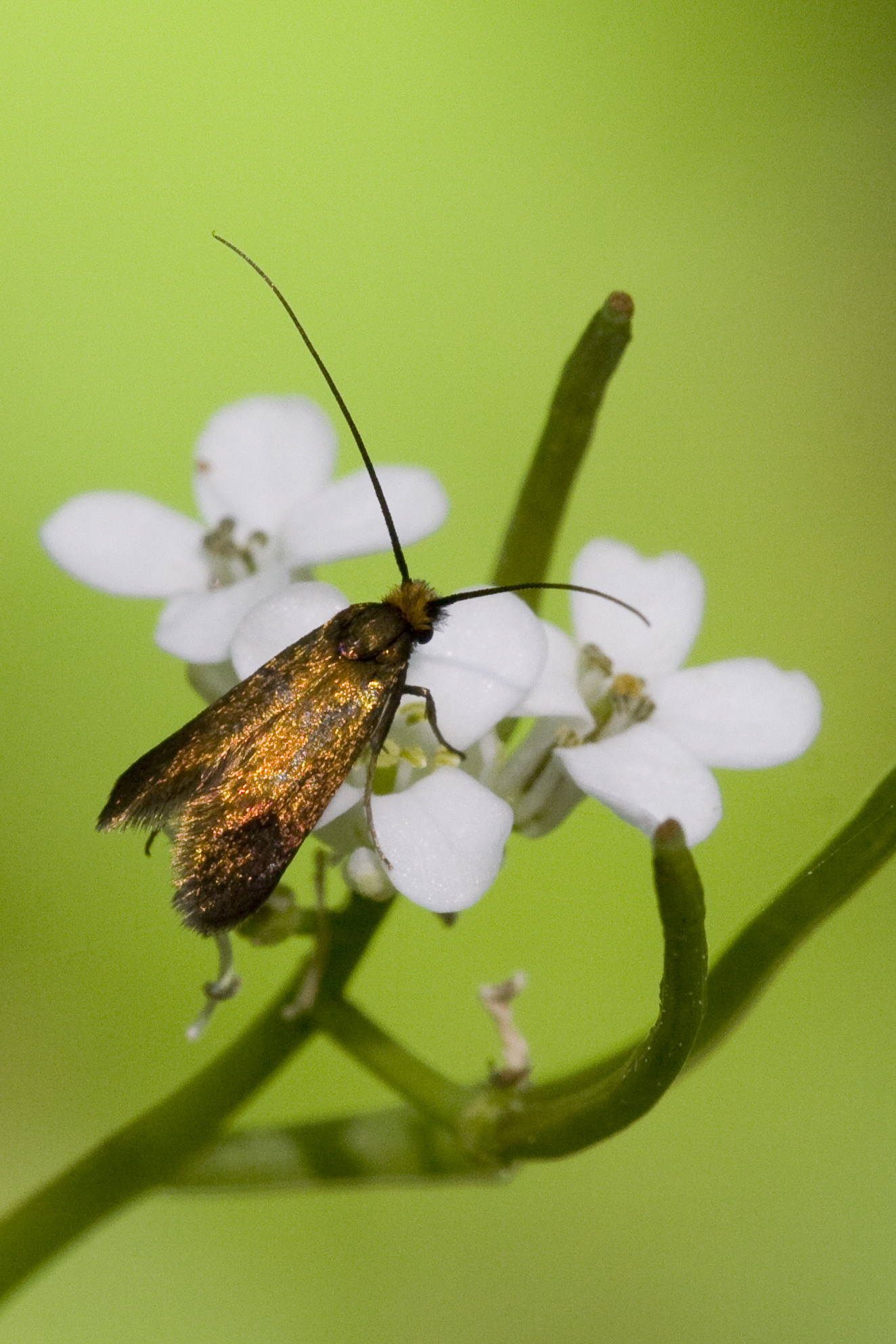

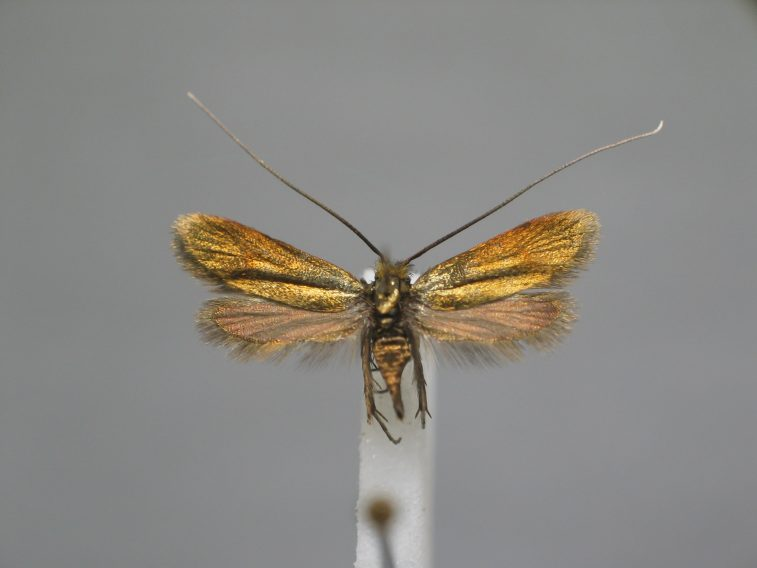

Scientific classification
- Domain: Eukaryota
- Kingdom: Animalia
- Phylum: Arthropoda
- Class: Insecta
- Order: Lepidoptera
- Family: Adelidae
- Genus: Cauchas
- Species: C. rufimitrella

Binomial name
- Cauchas rufimitrella (Scopoli, 1763)

Synonyms
- Phalaena rufimitrella Scopoli, 1763; Adela reskovitsiella Szent-Ivany, 1945; Adela rufimitrella Scopoli, 1763; Adela uhrikmeszarosiella Szent-Ivany, 1945

= Cauchas rufimitrella =

Species of moth

Cauchas rufimitrella is a diurnal lepidopteran from the family Adelidae, the fairy long horn moths. It is found in almost all of Europe, except Portugal, Ukraine and the southern part of the Balkan Peninsula.

The wingspan of the moth ranges from 10 to 12 millimeters. The thick erect hairs on the head vertex are black, more or less ferruginous-mixed above. Antennae in male 2 [2x the length of the wing], in female 1.5, black, tip whitish. The forewings are shining brassy bronze, sometimes partly or wholly coppery or metallic red purple. The hindwings are dark purplish fuscous.

The flight time is May to June.

Caterpillars live on the seeds of Cardamine pratensis and then they pupate over the winter.

== Gallery ==
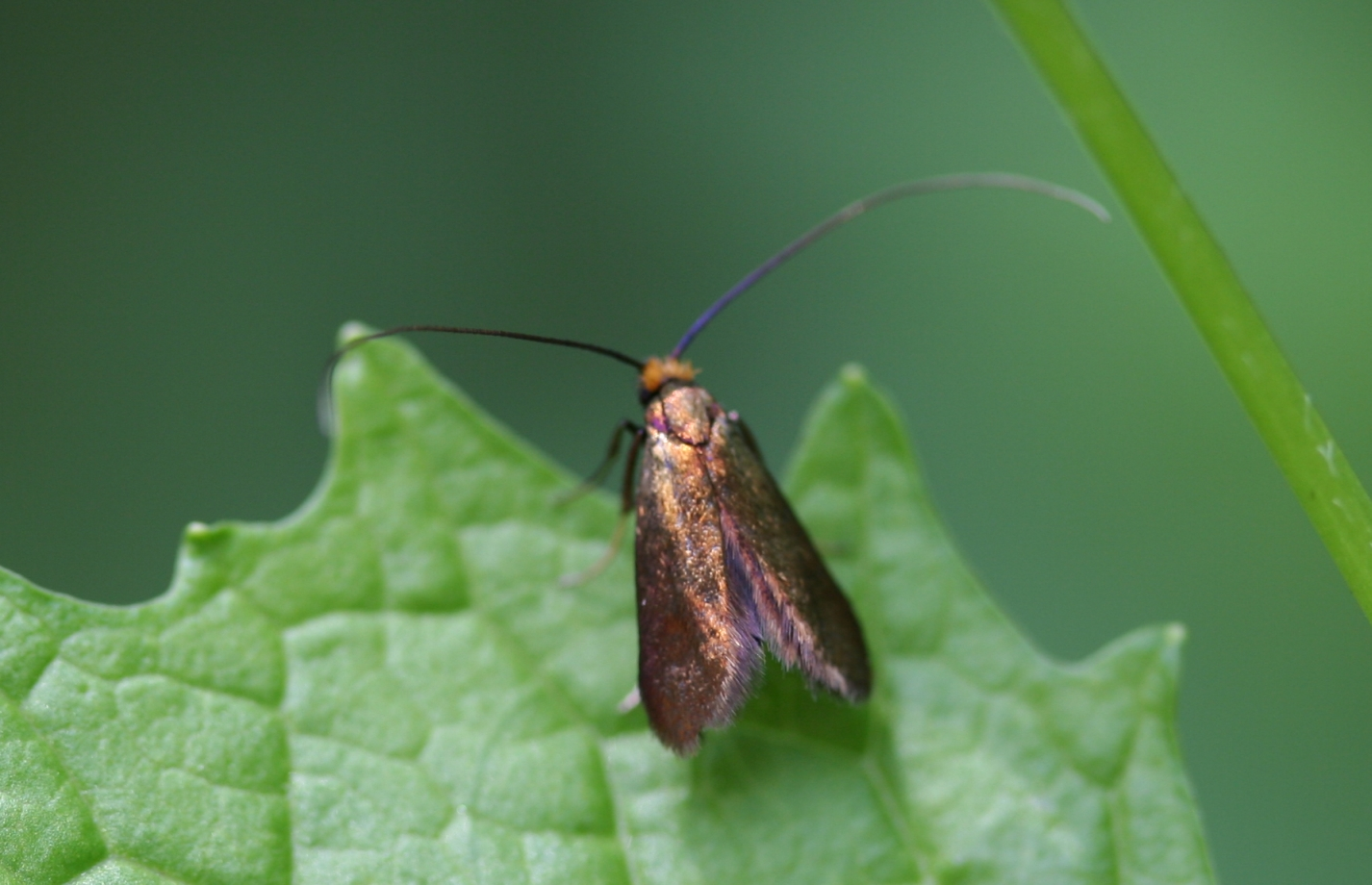

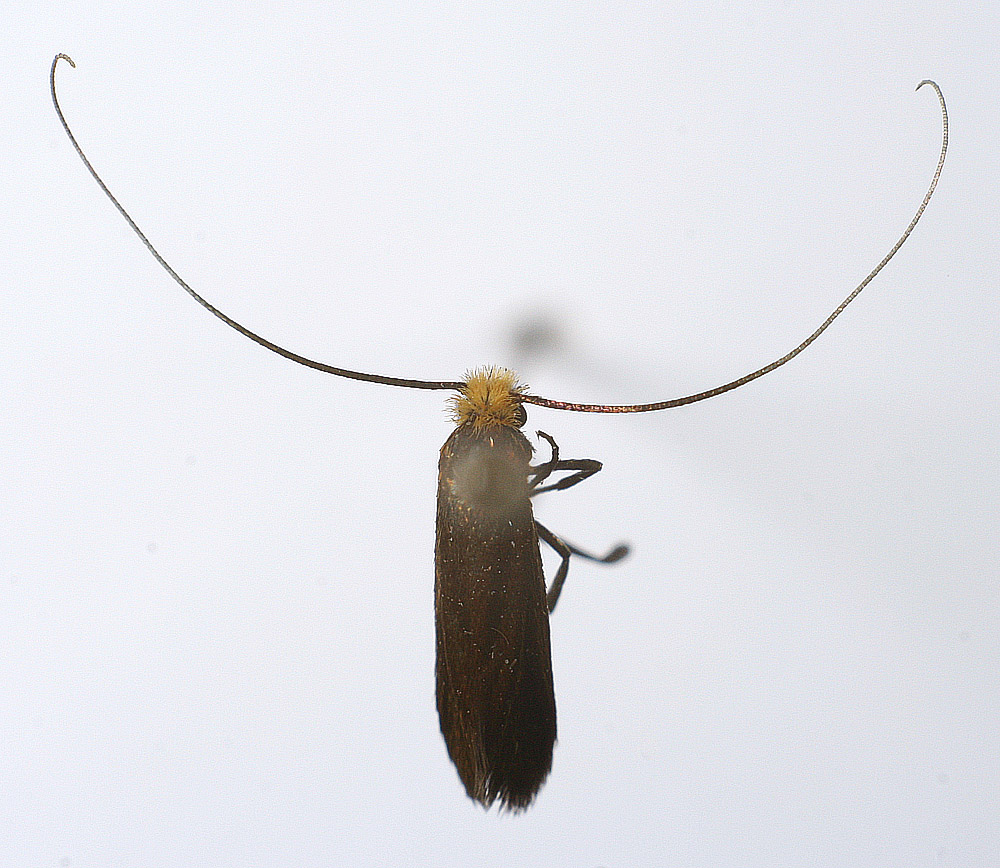

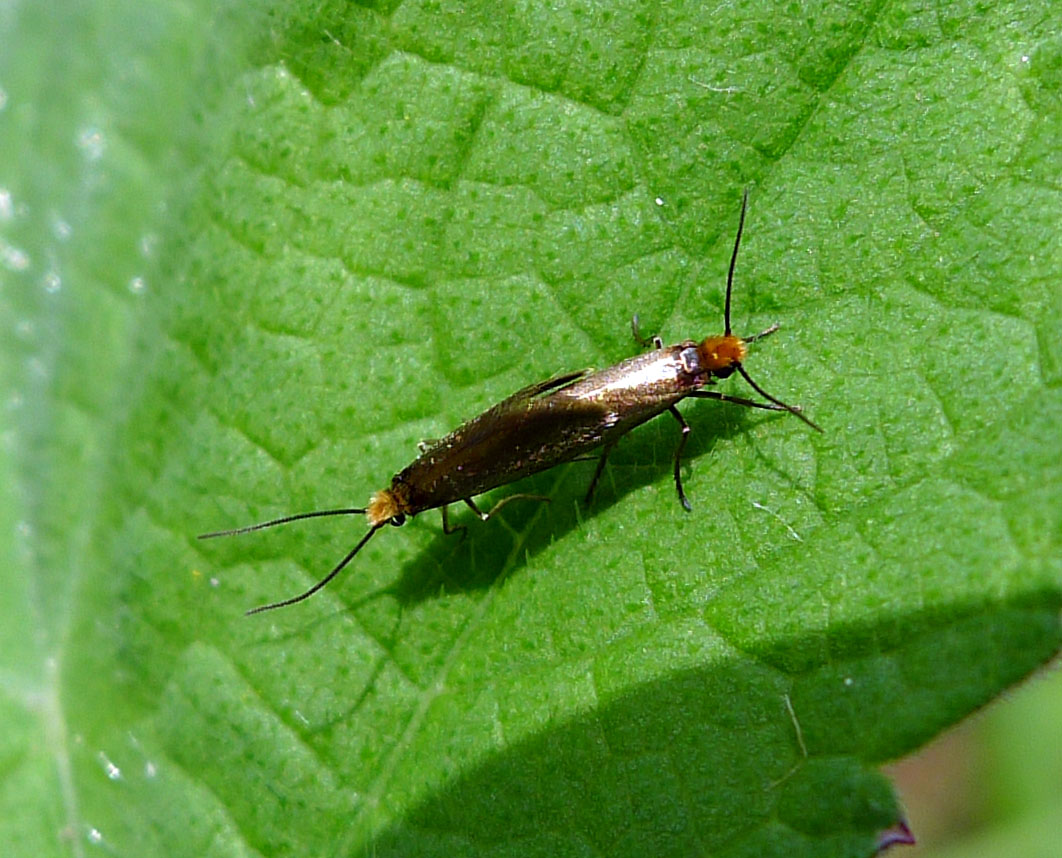
Mating pair

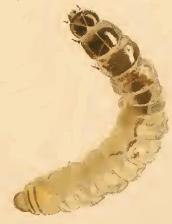
Larva

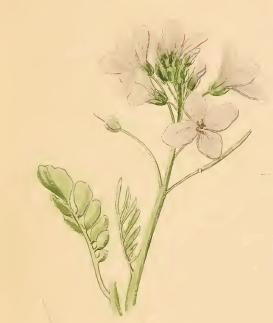
A sprig of Cardamine pratensis

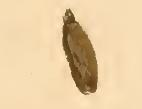
Larval case
