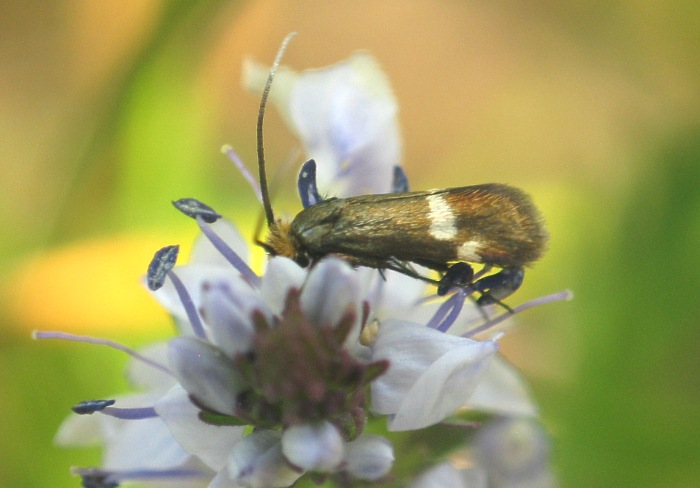
- Cauchas leucocerella
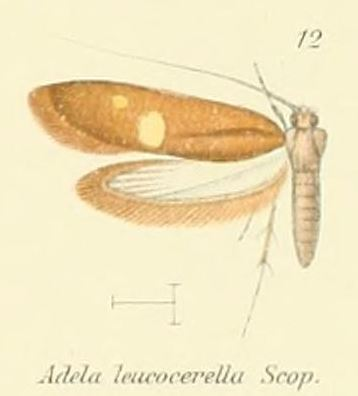

Scientific classification
- Kingdom: Animalia
- Phylum: Arthropoda
- Clade: Pancrustacea
- Class: Insecta
- Order: Lepidoptera
- Family: Adelidae
- Genus: Cauchas
- Species: C. leucocerella

Binomial name
- Cauchas leucocerella (Scopoli, 1763)

Synonyms
- Phalaena leucocerella Scopoli, 1763

= Cauchas leucocerella =

Species of moth

Cauchas leucocerella is a moth of the Adelidae family. It is found in most of Europe, except Ireland, Great Britain, the Benelux, the Iberian Peninsula, Switzerland, Denmark, Fennoscandia, Estonia and Lithuania.

The wingspan is 9–10 mm.
