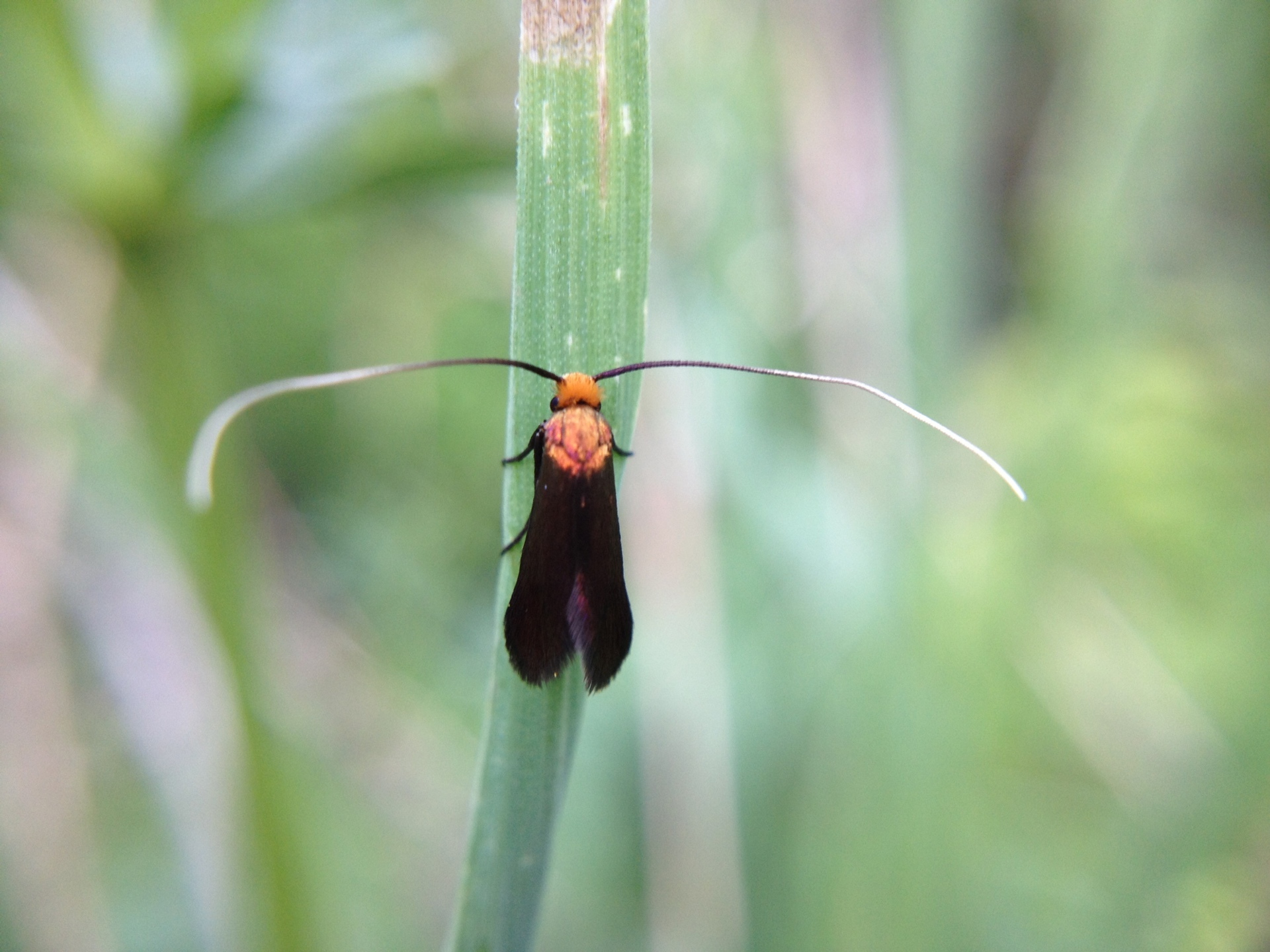

Scientific classification
- Kingdom: Animalia
- Phylum: Arthropoda
- Clade: Pancrustacea
- Class: Insecta
- Order: Lepidoptera
- Family: Adelidae
- Genus: Cauchas
- Species: C. canalella

Binomial name
- Cauchas canalella (Eversmann, 1844)

Synonyms
- Adela canalella Eversmann, 1844; Nemophora canalella

= Cauchas canalella =

Species of moth

Cauchas canalella is a moth of the family Adelidae. It is found in Russia.
