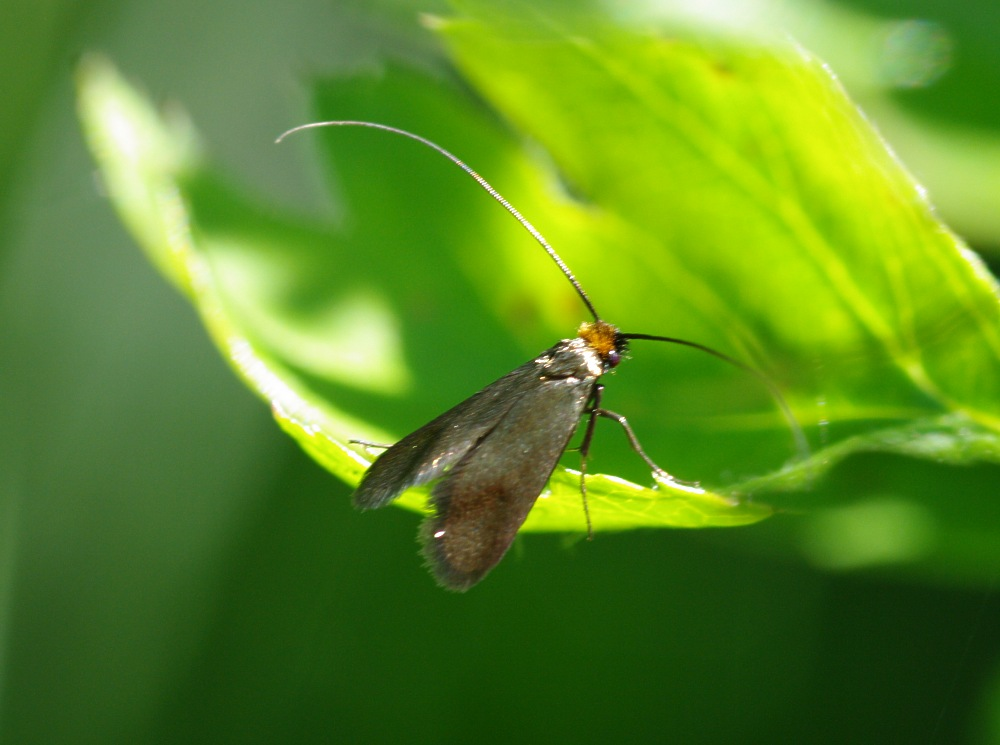
- Cauchas rufifrontella Bayern (Bavaria)

Scientific classification
- Kingdom: Animalia
- Phylum: Arthropoda
- Clade: Pancrustacea
- Class: Insecta
- Order: Lepidoptera
- Family: Adelidae
- Genus: Cauchas
- Species: C. rufifrontella

Binomial name
- Cauchas rufifrontella (Treitschke, 1833)

Synonyms
- Adela rufifrontella Treitschke, 1833

= Cauchas rufifrontella =

Species of moth

Cauchas rufifrontella is a moth of the Adelidae family. It is found in most of Europe, except Ireland, Great Britain, the Benelux, the Iberian Peninsula, Switzerland, Fennoscandia, the Baltic region, Bulgaria and Ukraine.

The wingspan is 9–12 mm.

The larvae feed on Valeriana officinalis.
