= Cauchas tridesma =

Scientific classification
- Kingdom: Animalia
- Phylum: Arthropoda
- Clade: Pancrustacea
- Class: Insecta
- Order: Lepidoptera
- Family: Adelidae
- Genus: Cauchas
- Species: C. tridesma

Binomial name
- Cauchas tridesma (Meyrick, 1912)

Synonyms
- Adela tridesma Meyrick, 1912; Adela trifasciella Staudinger, 1880 (nec Chambers, 1876)

Species of moth

Cauchas tridesma is a moth of the Adelidae family. It is found in Russia and Turkey.

The wingspan is 6–7 mm.
