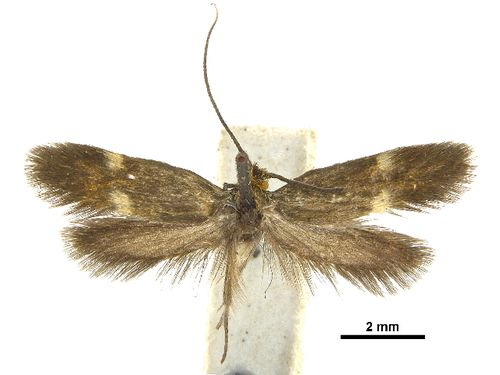

Scientific classification
- Kingdom: Animalia
- Phylum: Arthropoda
- Clade: Pancrustacea
- Class: Insecta
- Order: Lepidoptera
- Family: Adelidae
- Genus: Cauchas
- Species: C. sedella

Binomial name
- Cauchas sedella (Busck, 1915)

Synonyms
- Incurvaria sedella Busck, 1915; Chalceopla sedella

= Cauchas sedella =

Species of moth

Cauchas sedella is a moth of the family Adelidae. It was described by August Busck in 1915. It is found in North America, including Colorado.
