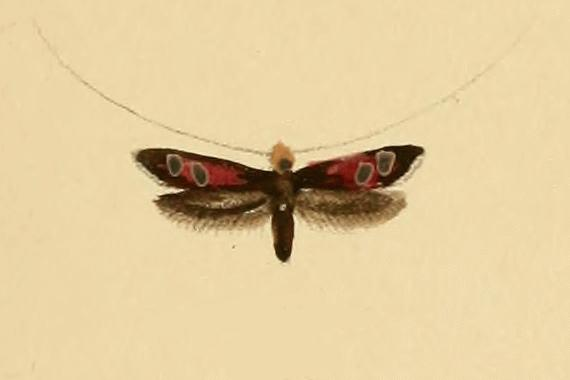

Scientific classification
- Kingdom: Animalia
- Phylum: Arthropoda
- Clade: Pancrustacea
- Class: Insecta
- Order: Lepidoptera
- Family: Adelidae
- Genus: Cauchas
- Species: C. anatolica

Binomial name
- Cauchas anatolica (Rebel, 1902)

Synonyms
- Adela anatolica Rebel, 1902

= Cauchas anatolica =

Species of moth

Cauchas anatolica is a moth of the family Adelidae. It is found in Greece and Turkey.

The wingspan is about 10 mm.
