= Cauchas albiantennella =

Scientific classification
- Kingdom: Animalia
- Phylum: Arthropoda
- Clade: Pancrustacea
- Class: Insecta
- Order: Lepidoptera
- Family: Adelidae
- Genus: Cauchas
- Species: C. albiantennella

Binomial name
- Cauchas albiantennella (Burmann, 1943)

Synonyms
- Adela albiantennella Burmann, 1943; Adela chrysopterella Kuppers, 1980

Species of moth

Cauchas albiantennella is a moth of the Adelidae family. It is found in France and Austria.
