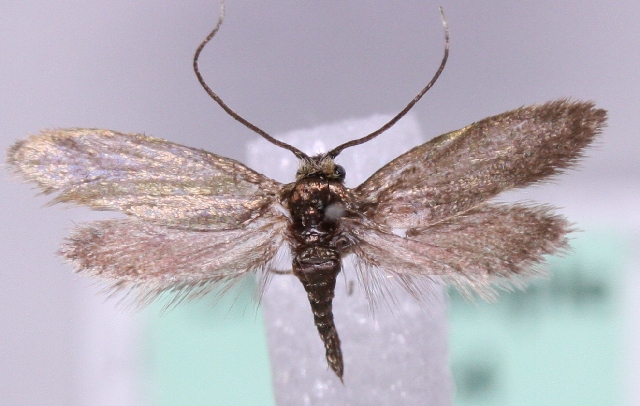

Scientific classification
- Kingdom: Animalia
- Phylum: Arthropoda
- Clade: Pancrustacea
- Class: Insecta
- Order: Lepidoptera
- Family: Adelidae
- Genus: Cauchas
- Species: C. breviantennella

Binomial name
- Cauchas breviantennella Nielsen & Johansson, 1980

= Cauchas breviantennella =

Species of moth

Cauchas breviantennella is a moth of the Adelidae family. It is found in Sweden, Finland and northern Russia.

The wingspan is 9–10 mm. Adults are on wing in July.
