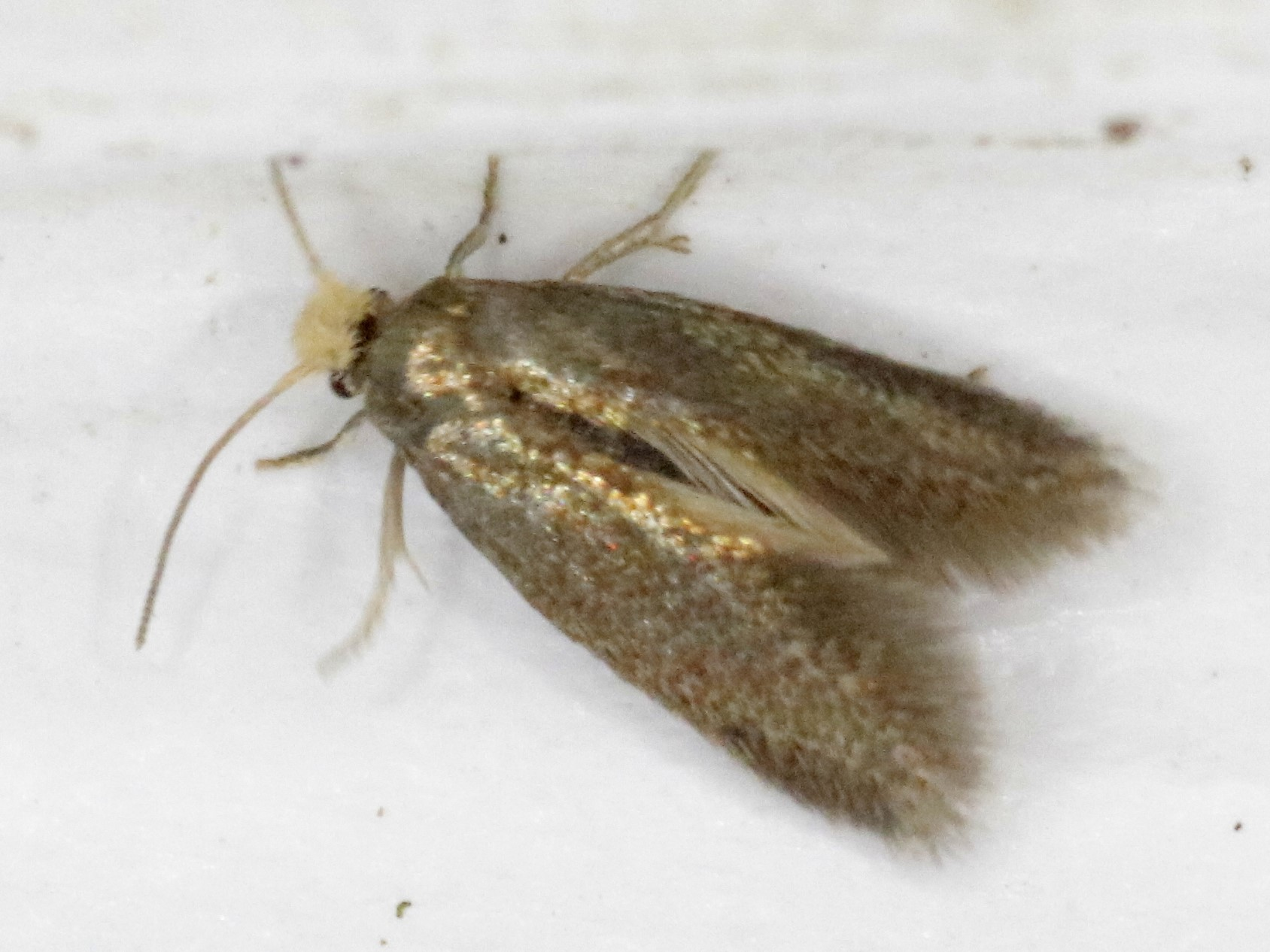

Scientific classification
- Kingdom: Animalia
- Phylum: Arthropoda
- Clade: Pancrustacea
- Class: Insecta
- Order: Lepidoptera
- Family: Adelidae
- Genus: Cauchas
- Species: C. dietziella

Binomial name
- Cauchas dietziella (Kearfott, 1908)

Synonyms
- Incurvaria dietziella Kearfott, 1908; Chalceopla dietziella

= Cauchas dietziella =

Species of moth

Cauchas dietziella is a species of moth in the fairy longhorn moth family Adelidae. It was first described by William D. Kearfott in 1908. It is found in eastern North America, including Alabama and Massachusetts.
