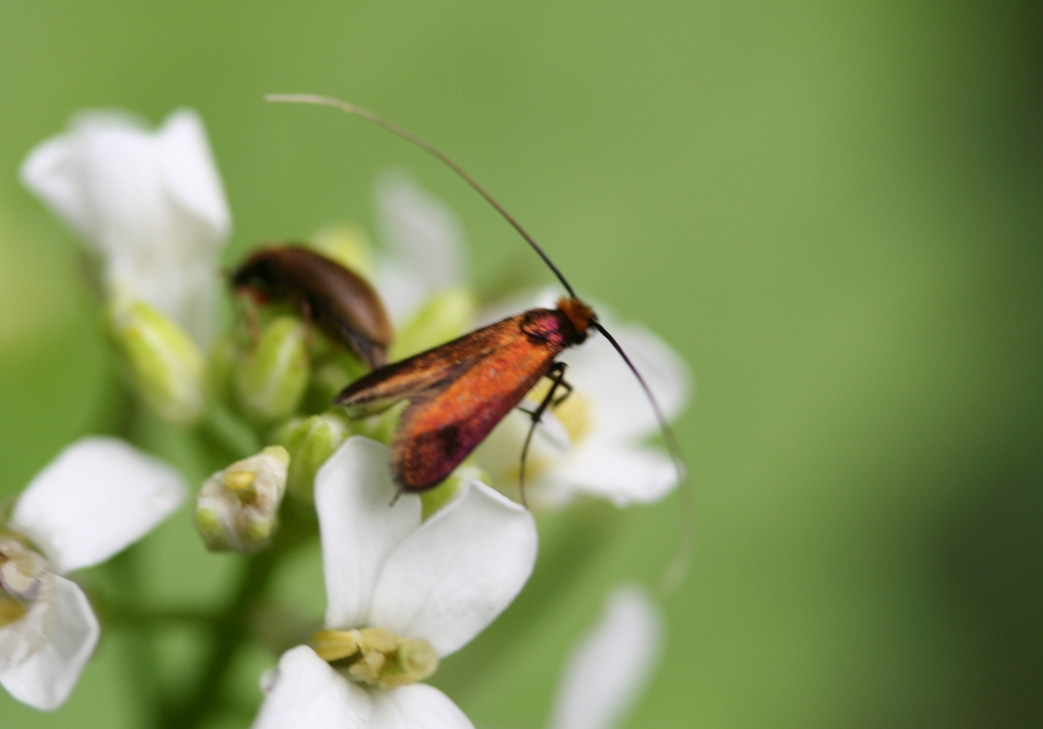
- Cauchas rufimitrella

Scientific classification
- Kingdom: Animalia
- Phylum: Arthropoda
- Clade: Pancrustacea
- Class: Insecta
- Order: Lepidoptera
- Family: Adelidae
- Subfamily: Adelinae
- Genus: Cauchas; Zeller, 1839

Species
- Several, see text

Synonyms
- Cyanauges Braun, 1919 (preocc. Philippi, 1865); Chlamydia Braun, 1921

= Cauchas =

Moth genus in family Adelidae

Cauchas is a genus of the fairy longhorn moth family (Adelidae). Among these, it belongs to subfamily Adelinae. The taxon "Cauchas" Philipp Christoph Zeller 1839 was originally created as a subgenus of the genus Adela Latreille 1796 but was raised to the genus level in 1980 by Ebbe Schmidt Nielsen .

== Species ==
- Cauchas albiantennella (Burmann, 1943)
- Cauchas anatolica (Rebel, 1902)
- Cauchas breviantennella Nielsen & Johansson, 1980
- Cauchas brunnella Nielsen & Johansson, 1980
- Cauchas canalella (Eversmann, 1844)
- Cauchas cockerelli (Busck, 1915)
- Cauchas cyanella (Busck, 1915)
- Cauchas dietziella (Kearfott, 1908)
- Cauchas discalis Braun, 1925
- Cauchas fibulella (Denis & Schiffermüller, 1775)
- Cauchas florella (Staudinger, 1871)
- Cauchas leucocerella (Scopoli, 1763)
- Cauchas rufifrontella (Treitschke, 1833)
- Cauchas rufimitrella (Scopoli, 1763)
- Cauchas sedella (Busck, 1915)
- Cauchas simpliciella (Walsingham, 1880)
- Cauchas terskella Kuprijakov, 1994
- Cauchas tridesma (Meyrick, 1912)
