= Cauchas brunnella =

Scientific classification
- Kingdom: Animalia
- Phylum: Arthropoda
- Clade: Pancrustacea
- Class: Insecta
- Order: Lepidoptera
- Family: Adelidae
- Genus: Cauchas
- Species: C. brunnella

Binomial name
- Cauchas brunnella Nielsen & Johansson, 1980

Species of moth

Cauchas brunnella is a moth of the family Adelidae. It is found in Uzbekistan.
