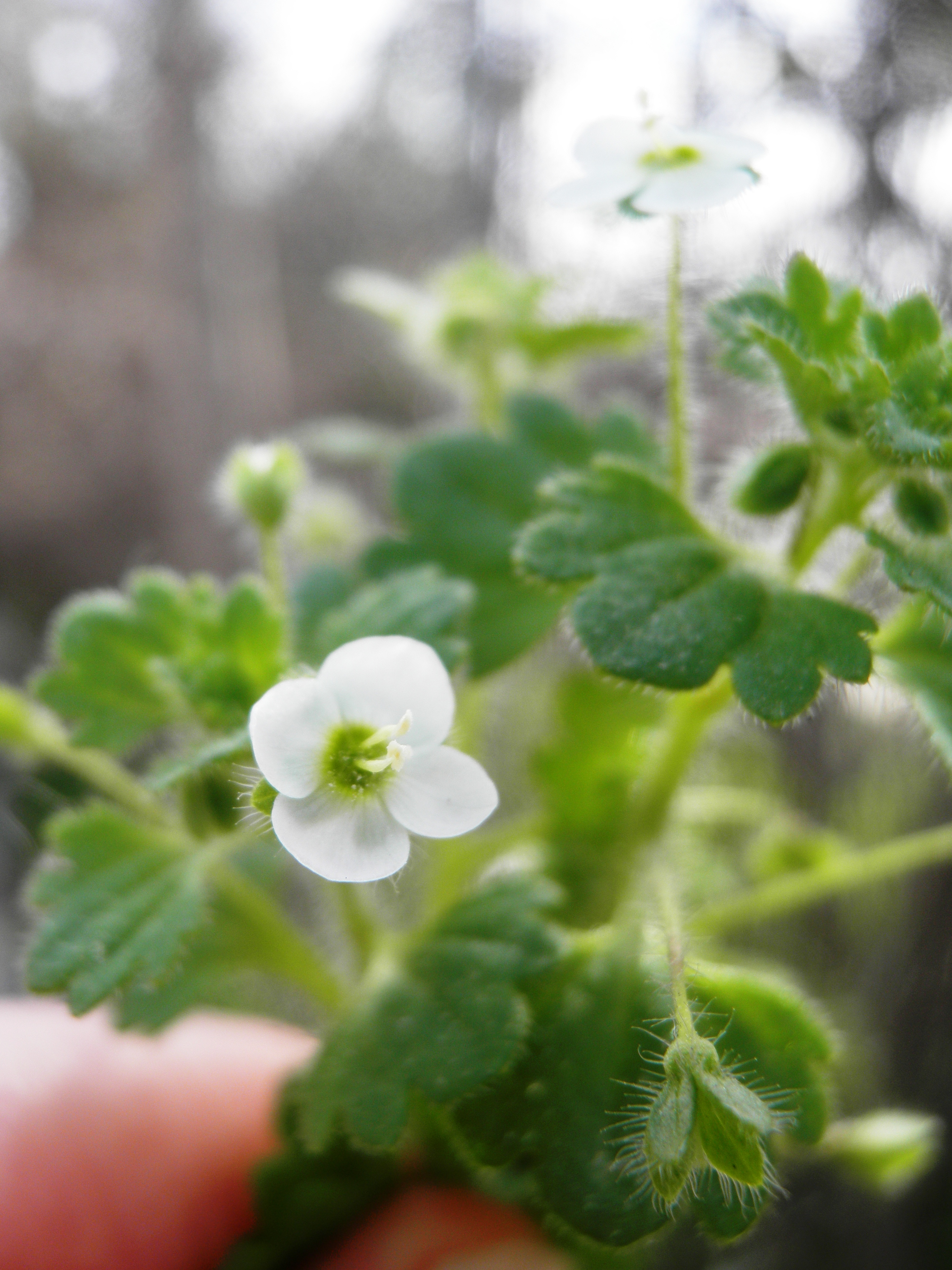

Scientific classification
- Kingdom: Plantae
- Clade: Embryophytes
- Clade: Tracheophytes
- Clade: Angiosperms
- Clade: Eudicots
- Clade: Asterids
- Order: Lamiales
- Family: Plantaginaceae
- Genus: Veronica
- Species: V. cymbalaria

Binomial name
- Veronica cymbalaria Bodard

Synonyms
- Cochlidiosperma cymbalaria; Pocilla cymbalaria

= Veronica cymbalaria =

Plant species in the veronica family

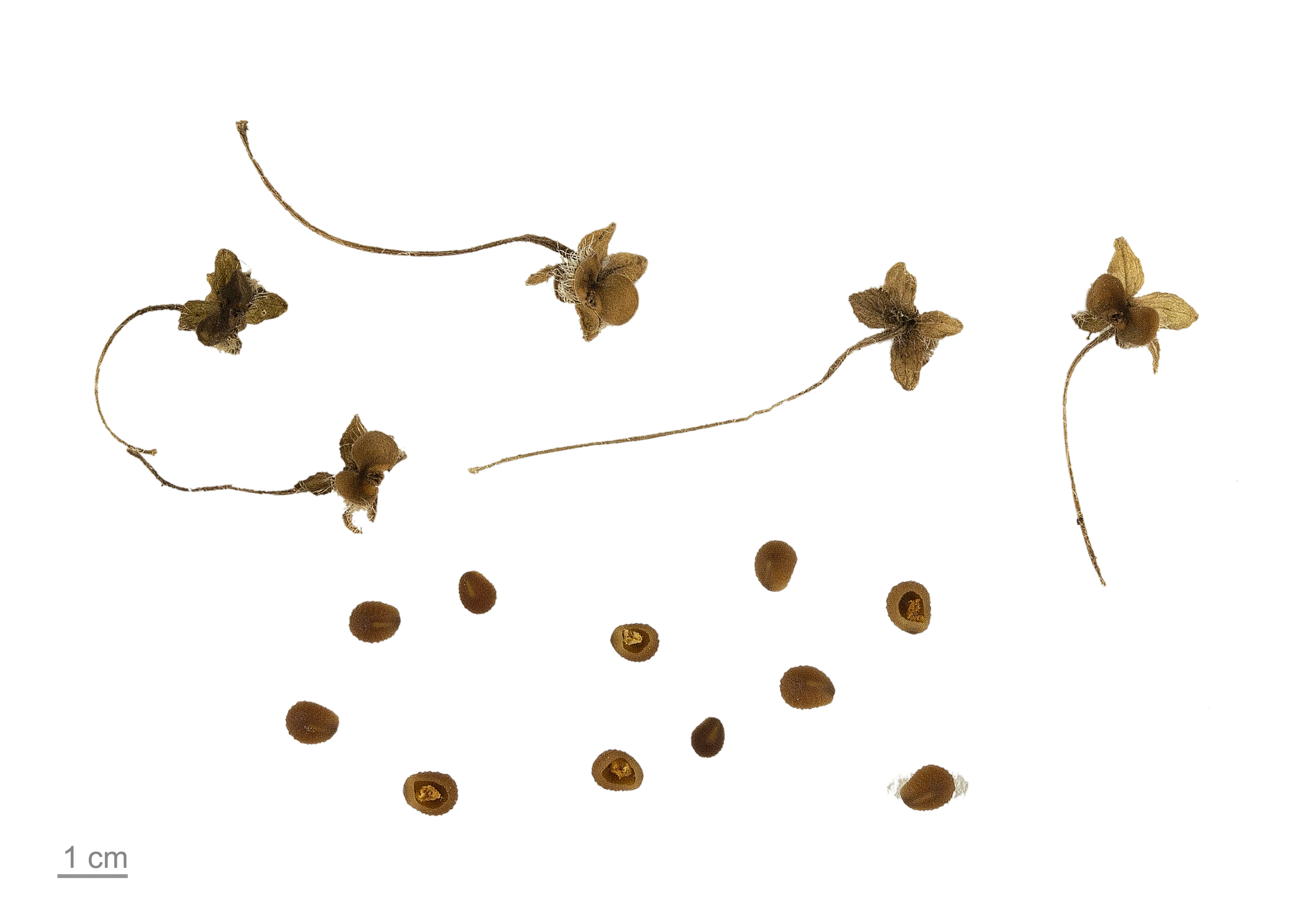
Veronica cymbalaria MHNT

Veronica cymbalaria, the pale speedwell, glandular speedwell or cymbal speedwell is a species of flowering plant in the Plantaginaceae (Plantain) family. It is native to countries surrounding the Mediterranean and a little further afield, and has been introduced to parts of the Americas and New Zealand.

== Description ==
A sprawling, white-flowered annual speedwell, able to cover areas under the right conditions, resembling Veronica hederifolia (Ivy-Leaved Speedwell) but with white flowers (6–12 mm diam) and more numerously lobed leaves (5-9 lobes). The sepals holding the flowers and fruit have broad lobes, whilst the fruit is shallowly dented at the top. The plant is usually lightly hairy, but can be very hairy or hairless.

== Taxonomy ==
Veronica cymbalaria was given its scientific name in 1798 by Pierre Henri Hippolyte Bodard. It is part of the genus Veronica which is classified in the Plantaginaceae family. It has no accepted subspecies or varieties, but has several among its 13 synonyms.

Table of Synonyms
Name	Year	Rank	Notes
Cochlidiosperma cymbalaria (Bodard) Opiz	1839	species	≡ hom.
Pocilla cymbalaria (Bodard) Fourr.	1869	species	≡ hom.
Veronica bodardii Jord. & Fourr.	1866	species	= het.
Veronica cuneata Guss.	1855	species	= het.
Veronica cymbalaria var. fallacina (Jord. & Fourr.) Rouy	1909	variety	= het.
Veronica cymbalaria subsp. glandulosa Peev	1978	subspecies	= het.
Veronica cymbalaria var. longipes (Jord. & Fourr.) Rouy	1909	variety	= het.
Veronica cymbalariifolia Vahl	1804	species	= het., nom. illeg.
Veronica cymbalariifolia var. fallacina (Jord. & Fourr.) Rouy	1909	variety	= het.
Veronica cymbalariifolia var. longipes (Jord. & Fourr.) Rouy	1909	variety	= het.
Veronica fallacina Jord. & Fourr.	1866	species	= het.
Veronica glandulifera Freyn	1876	species	= het., nom. illeg.
Veronica longipes Jord. & Fourr.	1866	species	= het.
Notes: ≡ homotypic synonym; = heterotypic synonym

== Distribution and habitat ==
Native to countries around the Mediterranean and slight further afield - Native to Albania, Algeria, Baleares, Bulgaria, Corsica, Cyprus, East Aegean Islands, France, Greece, Iran, Iraq, Israel, Italy, Crete, Crimea, Lebanon, Syria, Libya, Morocco, Palestine, Portugal, Sardegna, Saudi Arabia, Sicily, Spain, Tunisia, Turkey and ex-Yugoslavia countries, and introduced to Belgium, Chile Central, Great Britain, Louisiana, Netherlands, New Zealand North.

Its habitat in Europe is cultivated ground and other dry, open habitats.

Its habitat in Turkey is Macchie, open Pinus forests, rocky slopes, banks, dunes, walls, ruins, waste places and roadsides, 0–1200 m.
