= Cauchas discalis =

Scientific classification
- Domain: Eukaryota
- Kingdom: Animalia
- Phylum: Arthropoda
- Class: Insecta
- Order: Lepidoptera
- Family: Adelidae
- Genus: Cauchas
- Species: C. discalis

Binomial name
- Cauchas discalis Braun, 1925

Synonyms
- Chalceopla discalis

Species of moth

Cauchas discalis is a moth of the family Adelidae or fairy longhorn moths. It was described by Annette Frances Braun in 1925. It is found in the US state of California.
