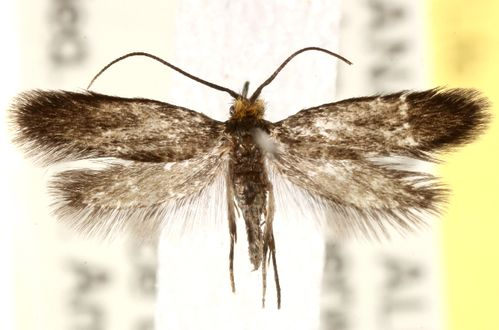

Scientific classification
- Kingdom: Animalia
- Phylum: Arthropoda
- Clade: Pancrustacea
- Class: Insecta
- Order: Lepidoptera
- Family: Adelidae
- Genus: Cauchas
- Species: C. cyanella

Binomial name
- Cauchas cyanella (Busck, 1915)

Synonyms
- Incurvaria cyanella Busck, 1915; Chalceopla cyanella

= Cauchas cyanella =

Species of moth

Cauchas cyanella is a moth of the family Adelidae or fairy longhorn moths. It was described by August Busck in 1915. It is found in North America, mostly in Canada, but also including Ohio.
