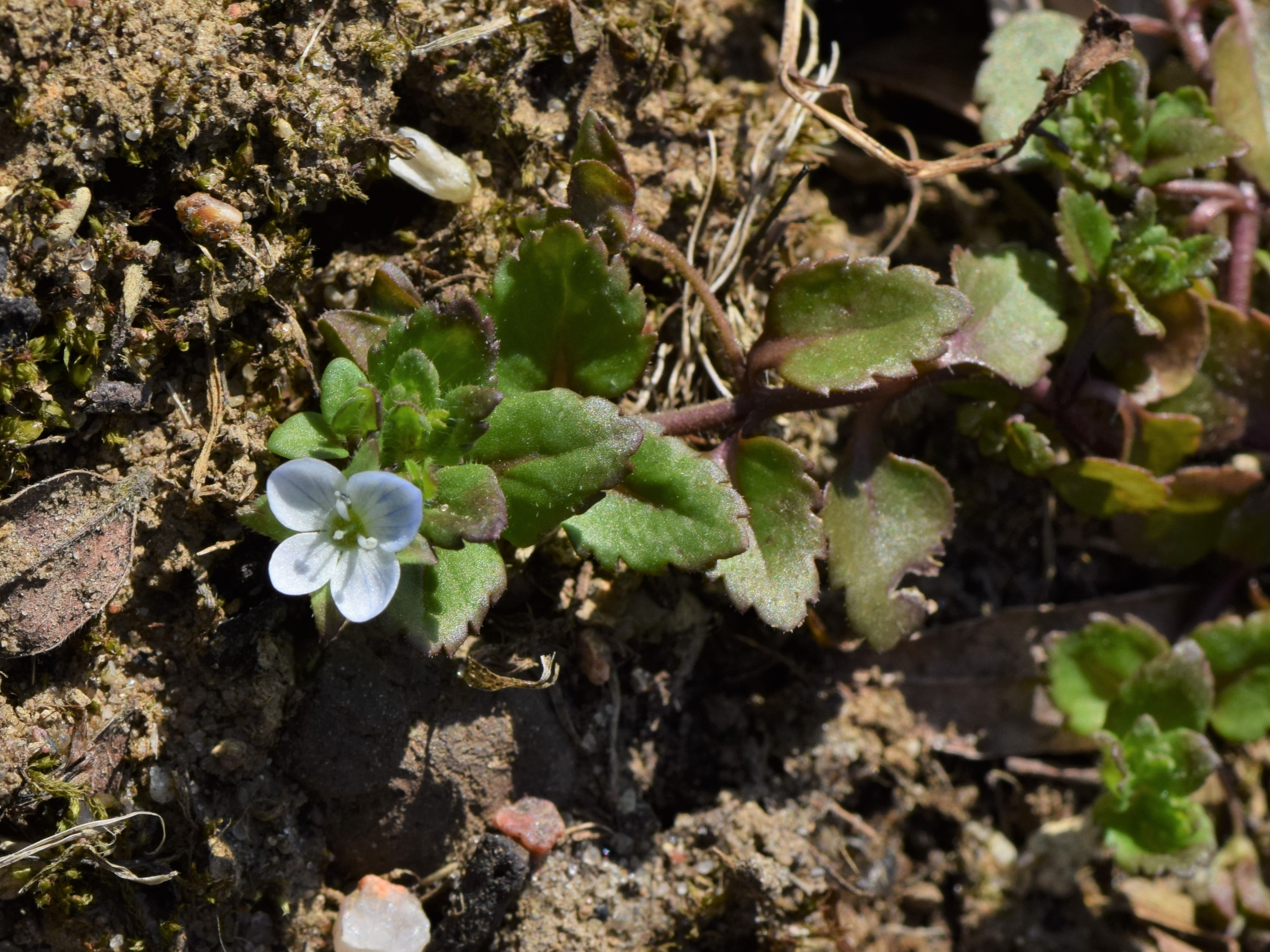

Scientific classification
- Kingdom: Plantae
- Clade: Embryophytes
- Clade: Tracheophytes
- Clade: Spermatophytes
- Clade: Angiosperms
- Clade: Eudicots
- Clade: Asterids
- Order: Lamiales
- Family: Plantaginaceae
- Genus: Veronica
- Species: V. agrestis

Binomial name
- Veronica agrestis L.

= Veronica agrestis =

Species of flowering plant in the plantain family

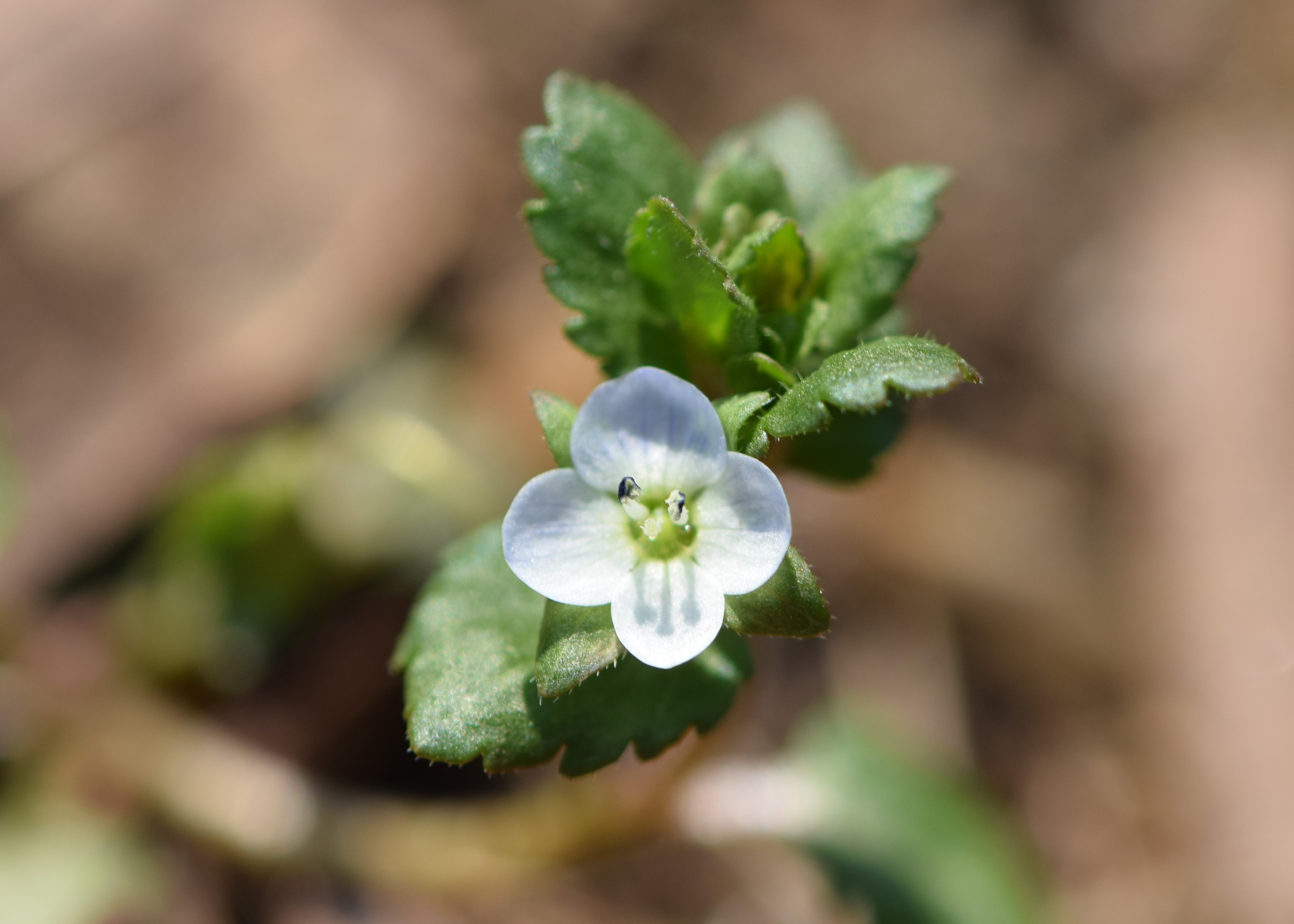
Flower showing mostly pale colour

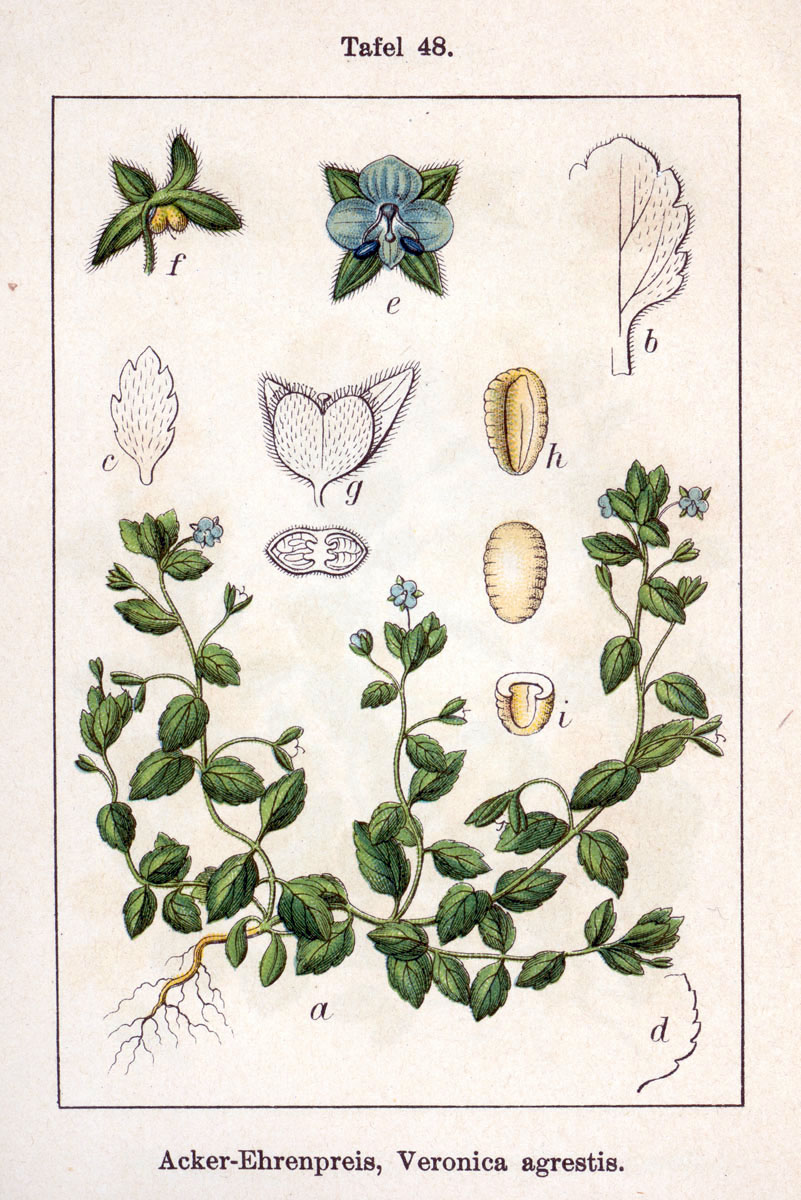

Veronica agrestis, the green field-speedwell, is a species of flowering plant in the Plantaginaceae (Plantain) family. It is native to Europe, western Asia and North Africa, and has been introduced to eastern North America, India and some other countries.

== Description ==
A sprawling, predominantly white to light blue flowered annual speedwell, sometimes lilac, with fresh green leaves. The flowers are small, with a 3–6 mm (0.12–0.24 in) diameter, and generally the lower part is white or pale with the uppermost part showing any conspicuous colour. The flower stalks are shortish (not clearly longer than the leaves), which mature to form a fruit capsule whose two lobes are parallel, clothed with long hairs or none, but lacking short hairs. The lower leaves are somewhat elongated in appearance, as the upper leaves are.

Similar species include Veronica polita (with dull green leaves, the lower leaves not elongated, its fruit with short as well as long hairs), and Veronica persica (with flower stalks often much longer than the leaves, and the lobes of the fruit diverging like a 'V').

== Distribution and habitat ==
Native to Europe, western Asia and North Africa, and introduced further afield - Albania, Algeria, Austria, Azores, Baltic States, Belarus, Belgium, Bulgaria, Canary Is., Central European Russia, Corse, Czechoslovakia, Denmark, East European Russia, Finland, France, Germany, Greece, Hungary, Italy, Kriti, Libya, Madeira, Morocco, Netherlands, Northwest European Russia, Norway, Palestine, Poland, Portugal, Romania, Sardegna, Sicilia, South European Russia, Spain, Sweden, Switzerland, Tunisia, Ukraine and Yugoslavia, and introduced to Alabama, Assam, Bangladesh, Bermuda, District of Columbia, Falkland Is., Florida, Great Britain, Haiti, Illinois, India, Ireland, Kentucky, Louisiana, Maryland, Massachusetts, Mauritius, New York, Newfoundland, Northern Provinces, Nova Scotia, Pennsylvania, Québec, Réunion, St.Helena, Texas, Tristan da Cunha, Turkmenistan and Vermont.

Its habitat in Europe is cultivated ground, somewhat a calcifuge.

Its habitat in the United States is light, non-calcareous, moist soils, gravelly soils, (0)300–800 m.
