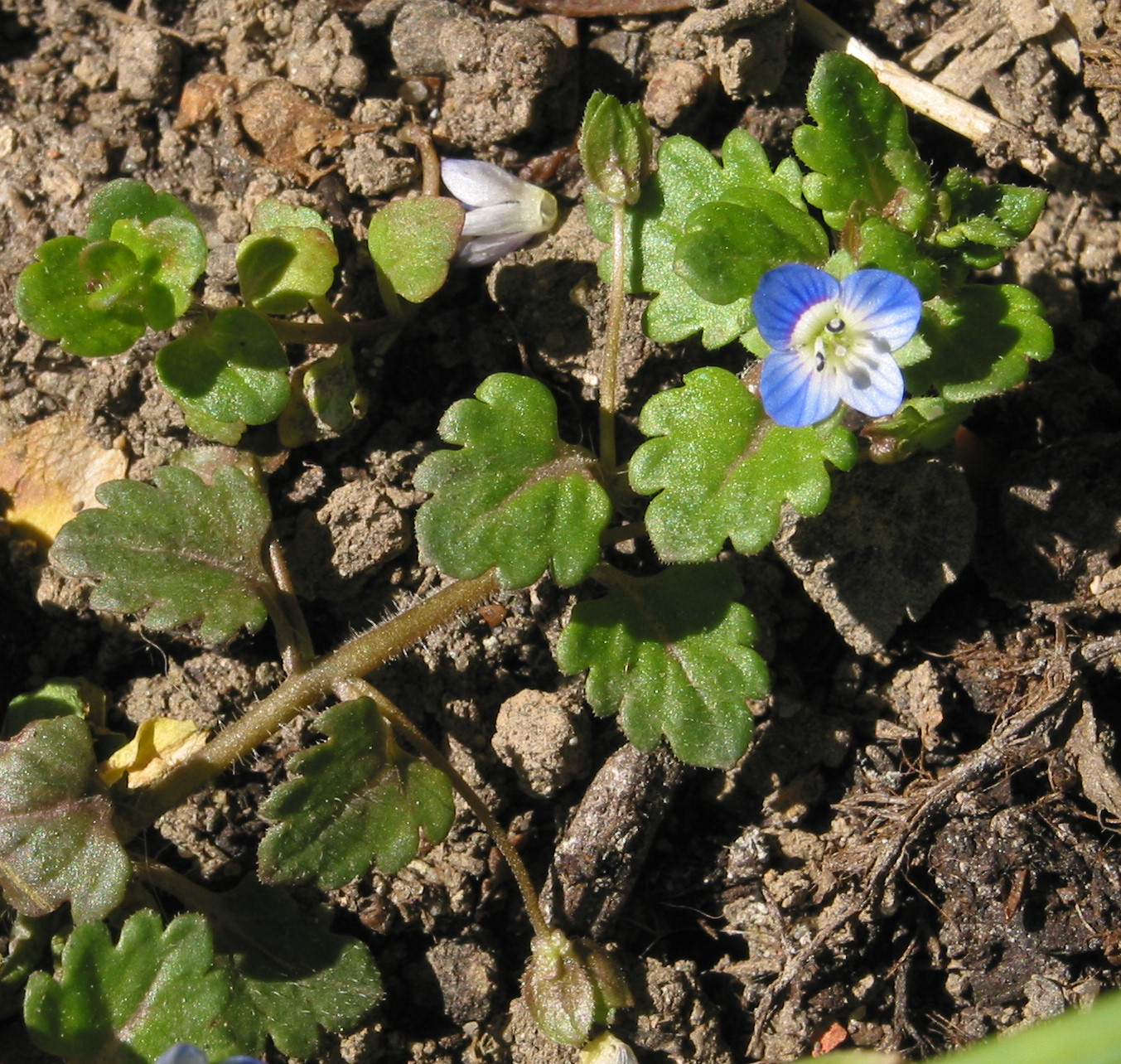

Scientific classification
- Kingdom: Plantae
- Clade: Tracheophytes
- Clade: Angiosperms
- Clade: Eudicots
- Clade: Asterids
- Order: Lamiales
- Family: Plantaginaceae
- Genus: Veronica
- Species: V. polita

Binomial name
- Veronica polita Fr.

Subspecies
- V. p. subsp. lilacina (T.Yamaz.) T.Yamaz.; V. p. subsp. polita

Synonyms
- List: Cardia didyma; Pocilla polita; Veronica agrestis var. carnosula; Veronica agrestis subsp. didyma; Veronica agrestis subsp. didyma; Veronica agrestis var. didyma; Veronica agrestis var. incisocrenata; Veronica agrestis subsp. polita; Veronica agrestis subsp. polita; Veronica agrestis var. polita; Veronica agrestis var. polita; Veronica caninotesticulata; Veronica colocensis; Veronica didyma; Veronica didyma var. lilacina; Veronica didyma f. pusilla; Veronica didyma var. thellungiana; Veronica nitidula; Veronica polita var. albiflora; Veronica polita var. autumnalis; Veronica polita var. caerulea; Veronica polita var. discolor; Veronica polita var. lilacina; Veronica polita subsp. ludwigiana; Veronica polita var. rosea; Veronica polita var. rosella; Veronica polita subsp. thellungiana; Veronica polita var. vernalis; Veronica restrictior; Veronica thellungiana

= Veronica polita =

Plant species in the veronica family

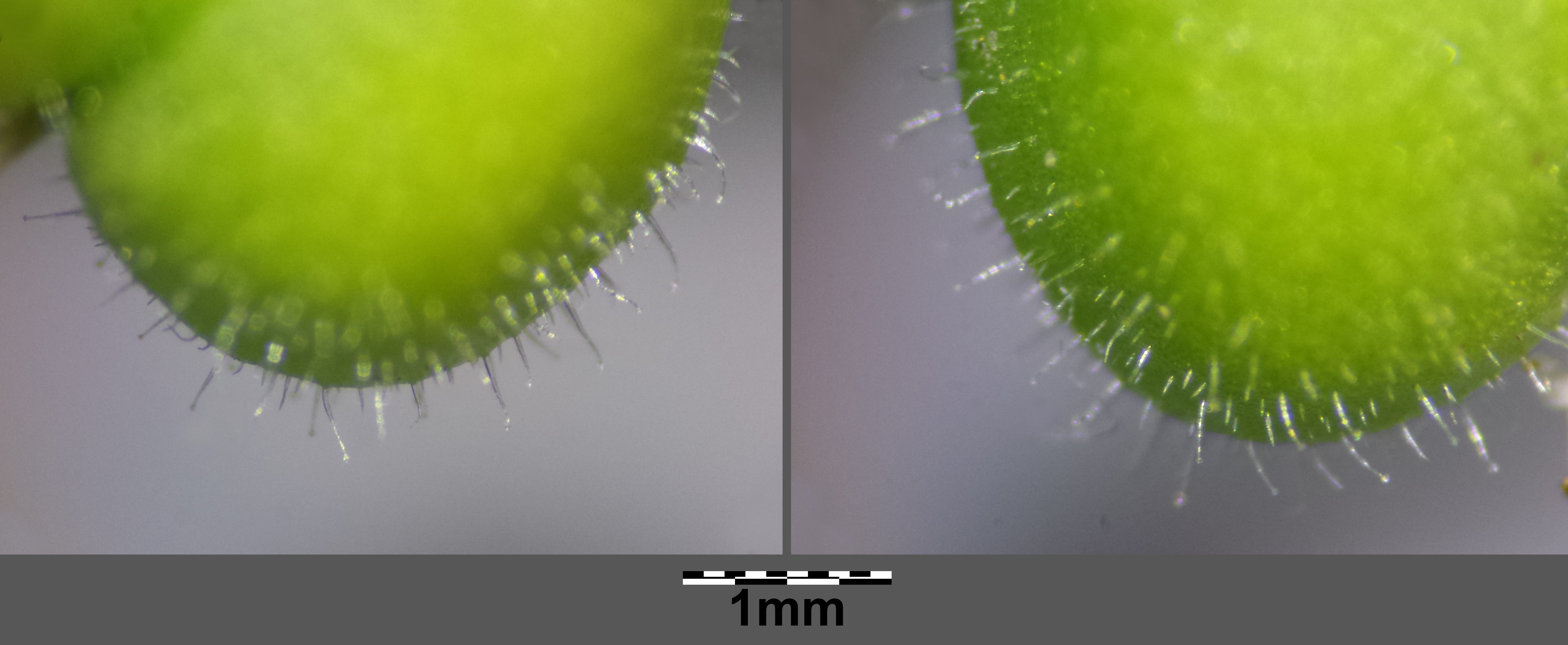
Surface of fruit capsule showing short and long hairs

Veronica polita, the grey field-speedwell is a species of flowering plant in the Plantaginaceae (Plantain) family. It is native to Europe, southwestern Asia, North Africa, the Arabian Peninsula and a few nearby countries, and has been introduced to many countries worldwide particularly as a weed of cultivation.

== Description ==
A sprawling, blue-flowered annual speedwell, with somewhat dull green, toothed leaves, broadest at the base. The flowers are smallish (4-8(12) mm diam), usually bold blue (though sometimes with a whitened lowermost part), and grow solitary on stalks emerging from the stem at the leaf stalk, the longest ones not clearly exceeding the leaves; they mature to form a fruit capsule whose two lobes are parallel, clothed with long and short hairs. The lower leaves are non-elongated in appearance, whilst the upper leaves are elongated.

Similar species include Veronica agrestis (with fruit lacking short hairs, and leaves fresh green, the lowermost elongated) and Veronica persica (with flower stalks often much longer than the leaves, and the lobes of the fruit diverging like a 'V').

Variants - P D Sell distinguishes var. polita with flowers 5–8 mm diameter, and var. grandiflora flowers 8–12 mm diam.

== Taxonomy ==
Veronica polita was given its scientific name in 1819 by Elias Magnus Fries. It is classified in the genus Veronica as part of the Plantaginaceae family. It also has two accepted subspecies.

- Veronica polita subsp. lilacina – Native to Japan, Korea, and the Western Himalayas
- Veronica polita subsp. polita – Native to Europe, southwestern Asia, and north Africa

== Distribution and habitat ==
Native to Europe, southwestern Asia, North Africa, the Arabian Peninsula, Korea, and Japan. It is introduced to many countries in the Americas and Asia.

Its habitat in Europe is cultivated ground.

Its habitat in Turkey is bare soil in open forests, steppe, cultivated land, roadsides, 0–1800 m.

Its habitat in North America is fields, ruderal places, calcareous soils, lawns, 0–600 m.

== Diseases ==
It is susceptible to downy mildew disease caused by the oomycete species Peronospora agrestis.
