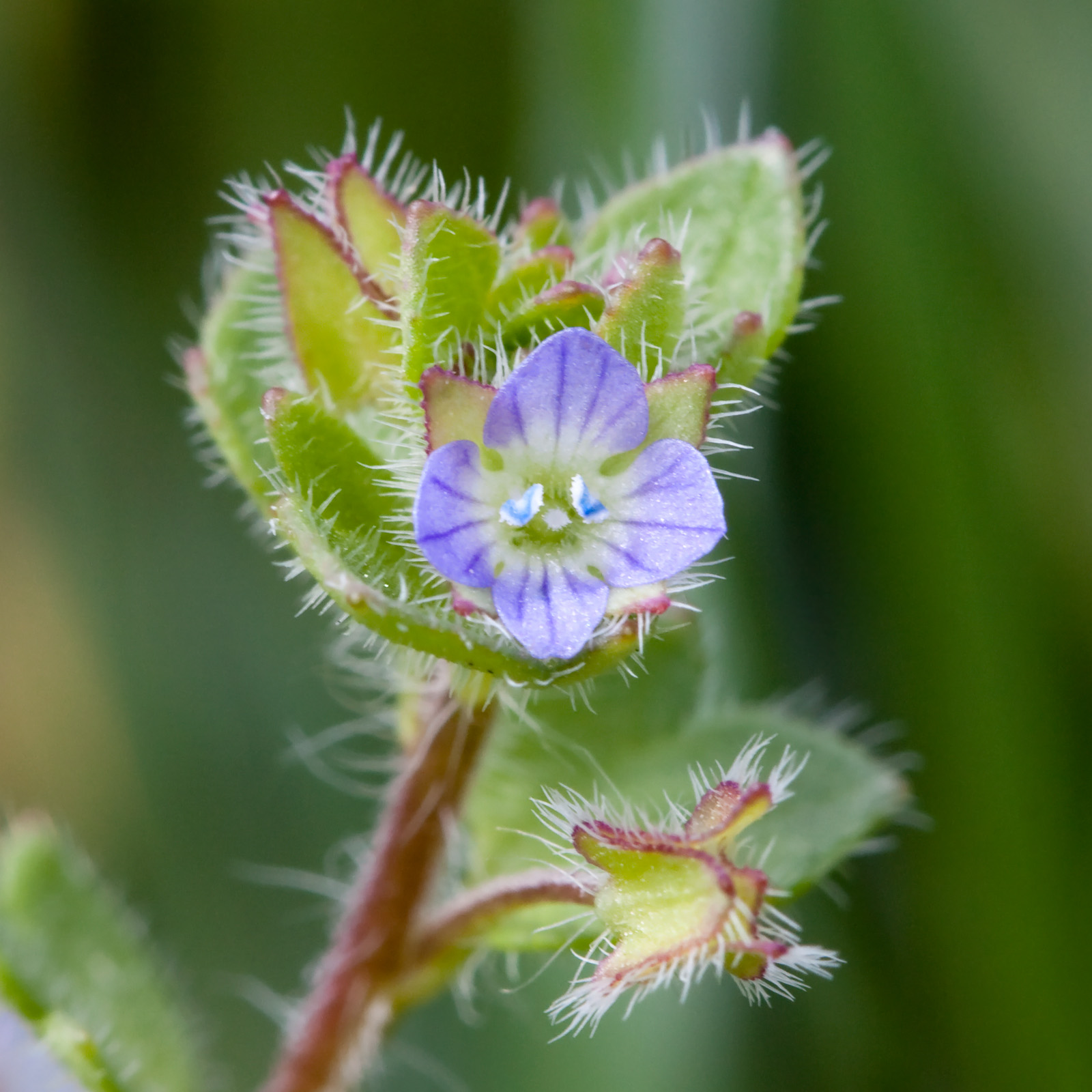

Scientific classification
- Kingdom: Plantae
- Clade: Embryophytes
- Clade: Tracheophytes
- Clade: Spermatophytes
- Clade: Angiosperms
- Clade: Eudicots
- Clade: Asterids
- Order: Lamiales
- Family: Plantaginaceae
- Genus: Veronica
- Species: V. hederifolia

Binomial name
- Veronica hederifolia L.

= Veronica hederifolia =

Species of flowering plant

Veronica hederifolia, the ivy-leaved speedwell, is a flowering plant belonging to the family Plantaginaceae. It is native to Europe, western Asia and north Africa and it is present in other places as an introduced species and a common weed. Solitary blue flowers occur in leaf axils, each with a corolla up to one centimetre (0.4 in) wide. The fruit is a dehiscent capsule.

== Description ==
It is an annual herb with procumbent to climbing stems up to 60 centimetres (24 in) long. The stems are green to purplish, round, with abundant spreading, wavy hairs 1 mm long (but forming a thick line along one side of the stem). The leaves are opposite, becoming alternate higher up the stem, with 4–15 mm long petioles and no stipules. The blades are divided shallowly into 5 lobes, like ivy, (sometimes 3–7 lobes or entire), darker above than below, up to 1.5 cm long, and are downy above and below with long hairs on the margins.

The flowers are solitary in the leaf axils on pedicels up to 18 mm long. The calyx has four triangular lobes which expand after flowering. There are 4–5 pale lilac petals, 2 mm long, with darker veins. There are 2 stamens, with blue anthers, and one style. The fruits are glabrous, 2-celled (sometimes 1–3) capsules.

== Taxonomy ==
It was named by Linnaeus in Species Plantarum in 1753. The specific epithet "hederifolia" simply means "ivy-leaved."

There are three subspecies: hederifolia, lucorum (Klett & Richt.) Hartl and insularis Gamisans. The latter occurs only in Corsica.

== Distribution ==
It is thought to be native to southern Europe and widely naturalised outside that range, including in northern Europe as far as Scandinavia, in the United States, Japan, Australia, New Zealand, and scattered places elsewhere.

In Britain, it is ubiquitous throughout the lowlands, becoming rare only in the mountains of Cumbria and the Highlands and Islands of Scotland. In Ireland it has a similarly south-easterly distribution, fading out in the west.

== Ecology and habitat ==
In Britain, it is mainly associated with inhabited areas, being common in towns and villages where it grows in gardens, hedges, road sides and on waste ground. It is also found, less commonly, in arable fields and more wild places. It is a lowland plant; its maximum recorded altitude was 380 m (1,250 ft) at Malham Moor in Yorkshire (although that was in 1888, so it might have been an atypical occurrence).
