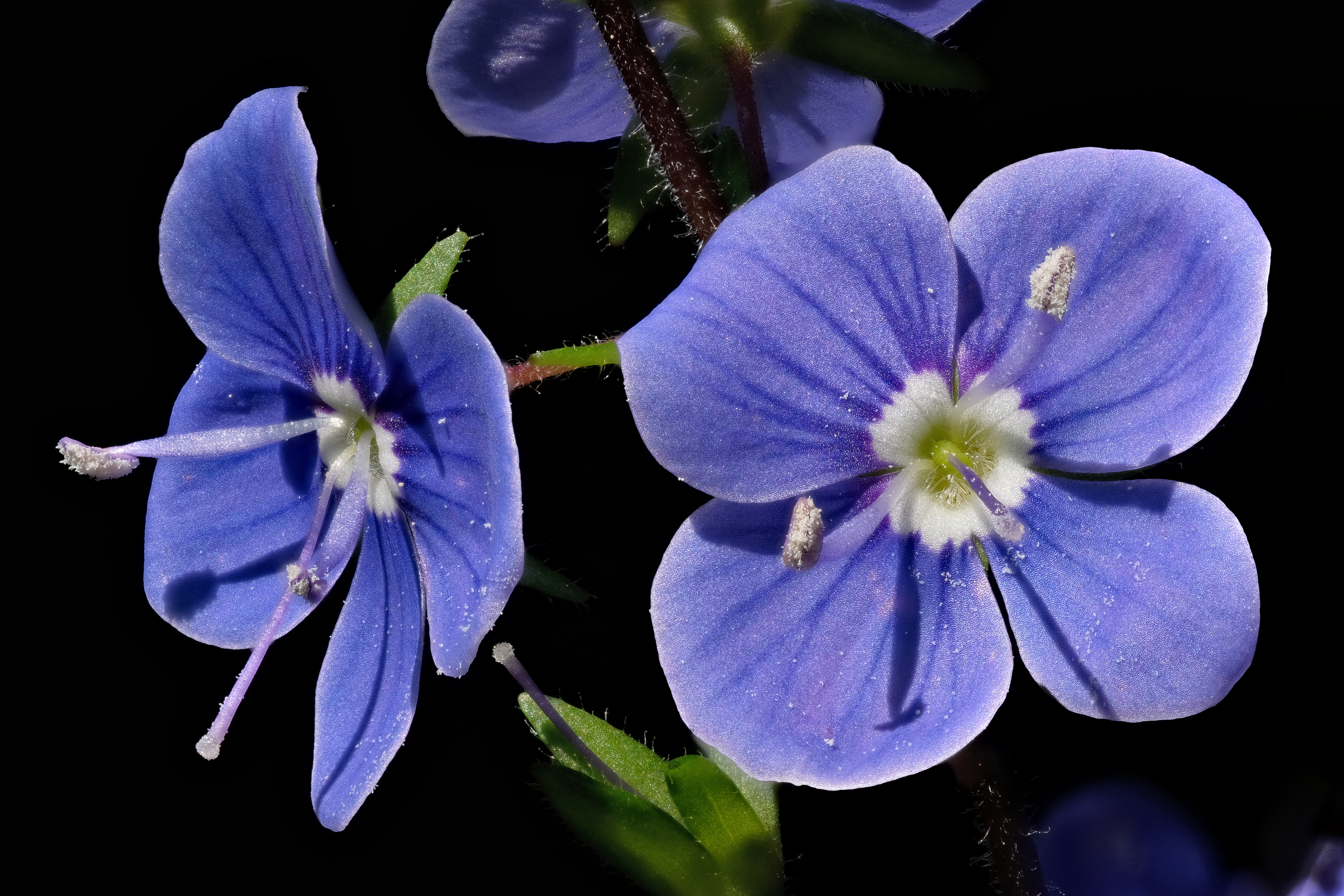

Scientific classification
- Kingdom: Plantae
- Clade: Tracheophytes
- Clade: Angiosperms
- Clade: Eudicots
- Clade: Asterids
- Order: Lamiales
- Family: Plantaginaceae
- Genus: Veronica
- Species: V. chamaedrys

Binomial name
- Veronica chamaedrys L.

= Veronica chamaedrys =

Species of flowering plant in the plantain family

Veronica chamaedrys, the germander speedwell, bird's-eye speedwell, or cat's eyes, is a herbaceous perennial species of flowering plant in the plantain family Plantaginaceae.

== Description ==
Veronica chamaedrys can grow to 20 cm (7.9 in) tall, but is frequently shorter, with stems that are hairy only along two opposite sides. The leaves are in opposite pairs, triangular and crenate, sessile or with short petioles. The flowers are deep blue with a zygomorphic (bilaterally symmetrical) four-lobed corolla, 8–12 mm (0.3–0.5 in) wide. The capsules are wider than they are long.

Leaves

The blossoms of this plant wilt very quickly upon picking, which has given it the ironic name "Männertreu", or "men's faithfulness" in German.

Veronica chamaedrys is a common, hardy turf so-called weed when it invades turf and lawns. It creeps along the ground, spreading by sending down roots at the stem nodes. It is propagated both by seed and stem fragments. Leaves may defoliate in the summer and winter but the stems will grow again next season. Unlike at least five other common speedwell species, such as corn speedwell (Veronica arvensis), the leaves are opposite on both the upper and lower parts of the plant. See Veronica for special weed control considerations.

The specific name chamaedrys is a combining form meaning "low" or "on the ground" derived from ancient Greek.

== Distribution ==
This species is native to Europe. It is found on other continents as an introduced species.

== Uses ==
Veronica chamaedrys has been used in traditional Austrian herbal medicine internally (as tea) for disorders of the nervous system, respiratory tract, cardiovascular system, and metabolism. In 18th century Britain, the plant had the reputation of being a cure for gout as well as being popular for making tea, the latter being so prevalent that the plant was nearly eradicated from London during the 18th century.
