= Kittentail =

Kittentail is a common name for several plants and may refer to:

- Synthyris species, especially:
  - Synthyris missurica, native to the Pacific Northwest of North America
- Veronica bullii, native to the Upper Midwest of North America
