= Rock speedwell =

Rock speedwell is a common name for several plants and may refer to:

- Veronica arvensis
- Veronica fruticans
