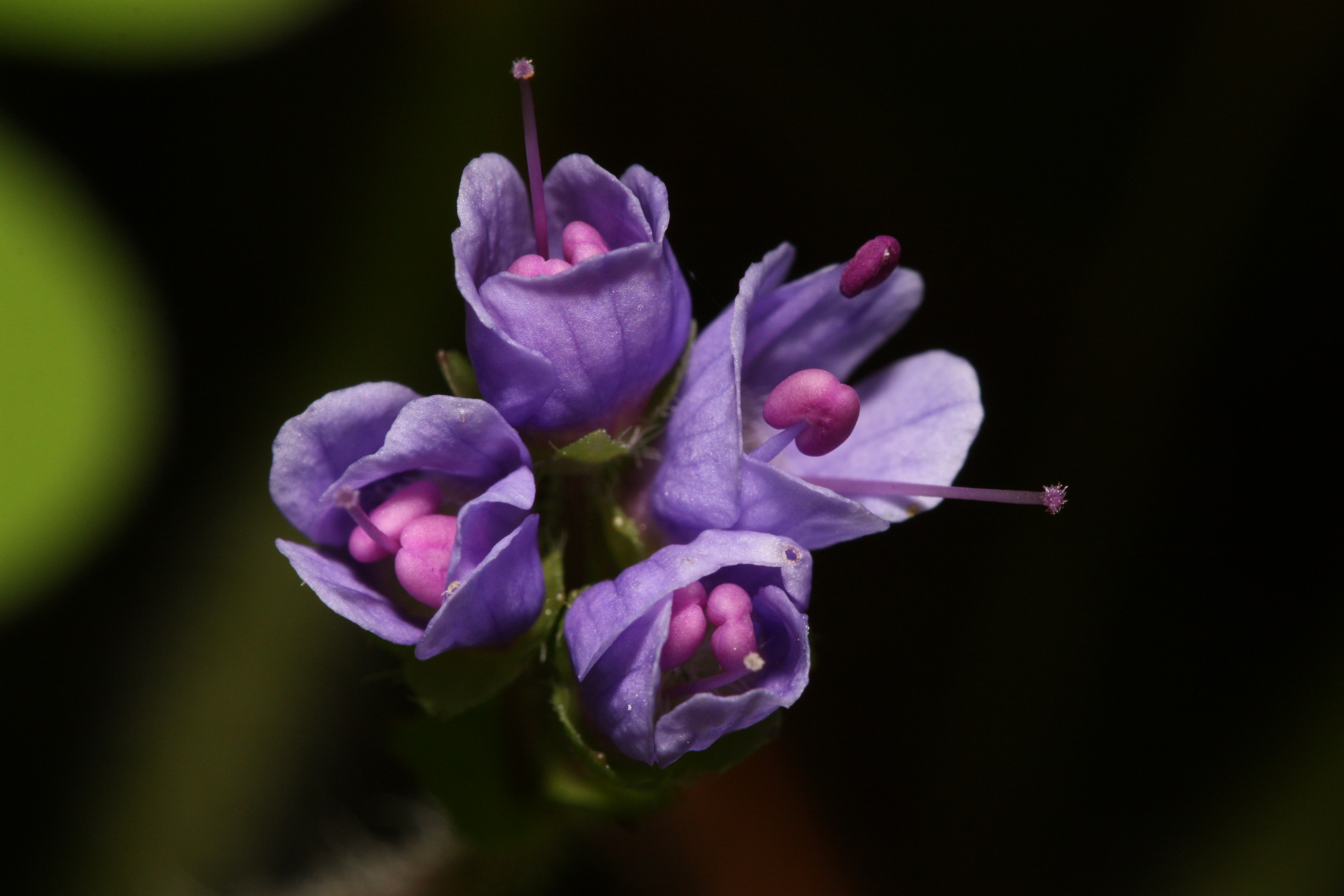

Scientific classification
- Kingdom: Plantae
- Clade: Embryophytes
- Clade: Tracheophytes
- Clade: Angiosperms
- Clade: Eudicots
- Clade: Asterids
- Order: Lamiales
- Family: Plantaginaceae
- Genus: Veronica
- Species: V. regina-nivalis

Binomial name
- Veronica regina-nivalis M.M.Mart.Ort. & Albach

Synonyms
- Wulfenia reniformis Douglas ex Benth.; Synthyris rotundifolia A.Gray; Wulfenia rotundifolia (A.Gray) Greene

= Veronica regina-nivalis =

Species of flowering plant

Veronica regina-nivalis is a species of flowering plant in the figwort family known by the common name snowqueen, or snow queen. It is native to the Pacific coast of the United States from the Puget Sound to San Francisco Bay Area, where it grows in the forests of coastal and inland hills and mountains. It is a perennial herb growing up to about 15 centimeters (5.9 in) tall. It has a rosette of basal leaves with hairy, lobed, heart-shaped or kidney-shaped blades borne on long petioles. The inflorescence is a small raceme of pale blue, lavender, or nearly white flowers each just under a centimeter long. The corollas are bell-shaped, the tube spreading into short lobes at the mouth, with two stamens tipped with large anthers.

Its common name alludes to the fact that it's one of the first wildflowers to bloom in late winter.
