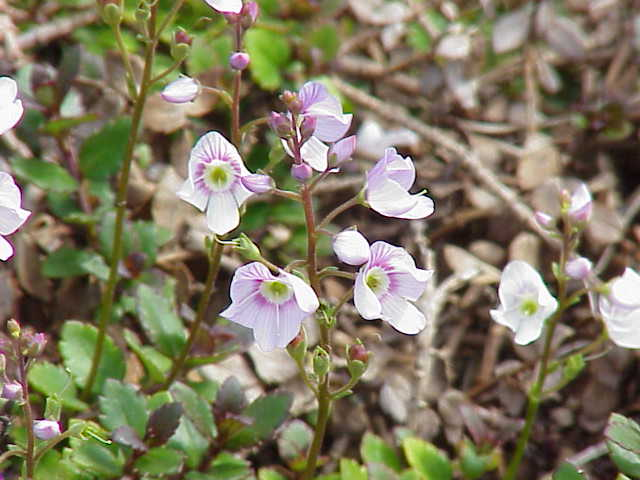
- Flowers

Scientific classification
- Kingdom: Plantae
- Clade: Tracheophytes
- Clade: Angiosperms
- Clade: Eudicots
- Clade: Asterids
- Order: Lamiales
- Family: Plantaginaceae
- Genus: Veronica
- Species: V. catarractae

Binomial name
- Veronica catarractae G.Forst.

Synonyms
- List: Hebe catarractae (G.Forst.) A.Wall; Parahebe catarractae (G.Forst.) W.R.B.Oliv.; Parahebe catarractae subsp. diffusa (Hook.f.) Garn.-Jones; Parahebe diffusa W.R.B.Oliv.; Veronica diffusa Hook.f.; Panoxis cataractae (G.Forst.) Raf.

= Veronica catarractae =

Species of flowering plant

Veronica catarractae, the waterfall parahebe, is a species of flowering plant in the family Plantaginaceae, native to New Zealand. Under its synonym Parahebe catarractae, its cultivar 'Delight' has gained the Royal Horticultural Society's Award of Garden Merit.
