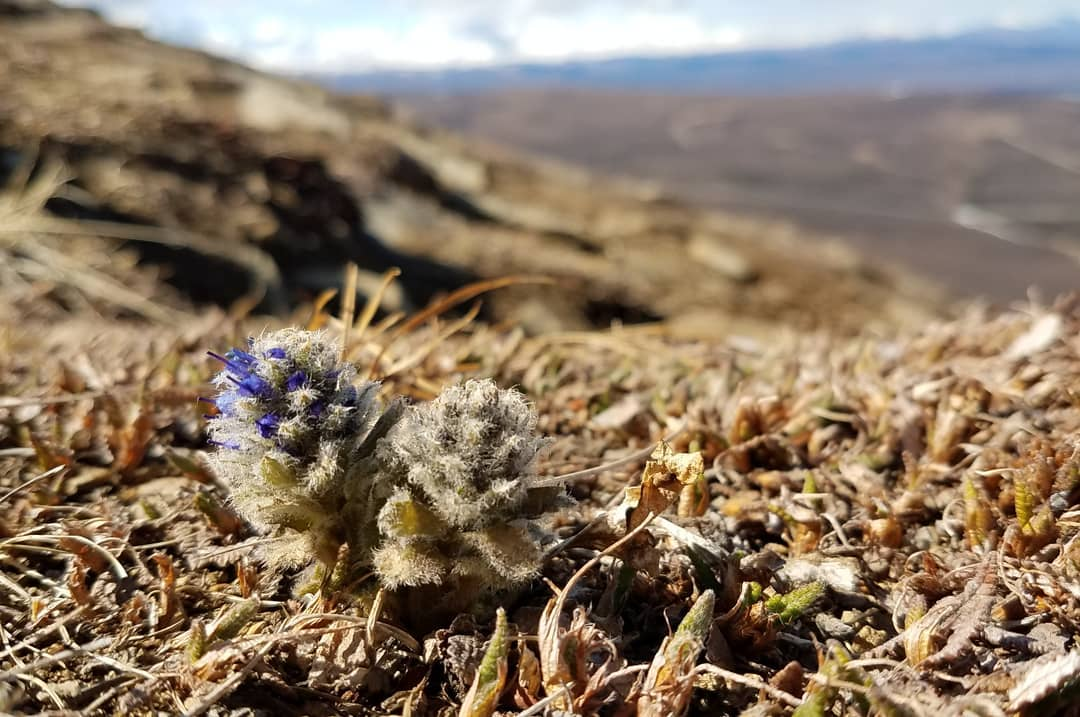
- Veronica alaskensis at Donnelly Dome, Alaska

Scientific classification
- Kingdom: Plantae
- Clade: Tracheophytes
- Clade: Angiosperms
- Clade: Eudicots
- Clade: Asterids
- Order: Lamiales
- Family: Plantaginaceae
- Genus: Veronica
- Species: V. alaskensis

Binomial name
- Veronica alaskensis M.M.Mart.Ort. & Albach

Synonyms
- Synthyris borealis Pennell

= Veronica alaskensis =

Species of flowering plant

Veronica alaskensis, known as Alaska speedwell or northern kittentails, is a flowering plant in the genus Veronica of the family Plantaginaceae. It was first formally named in 1933 by Francis W. Pennell and was transferred to the genus Veronica in 2004. Veronica alaskensis is native to Alaska and Yukon.
