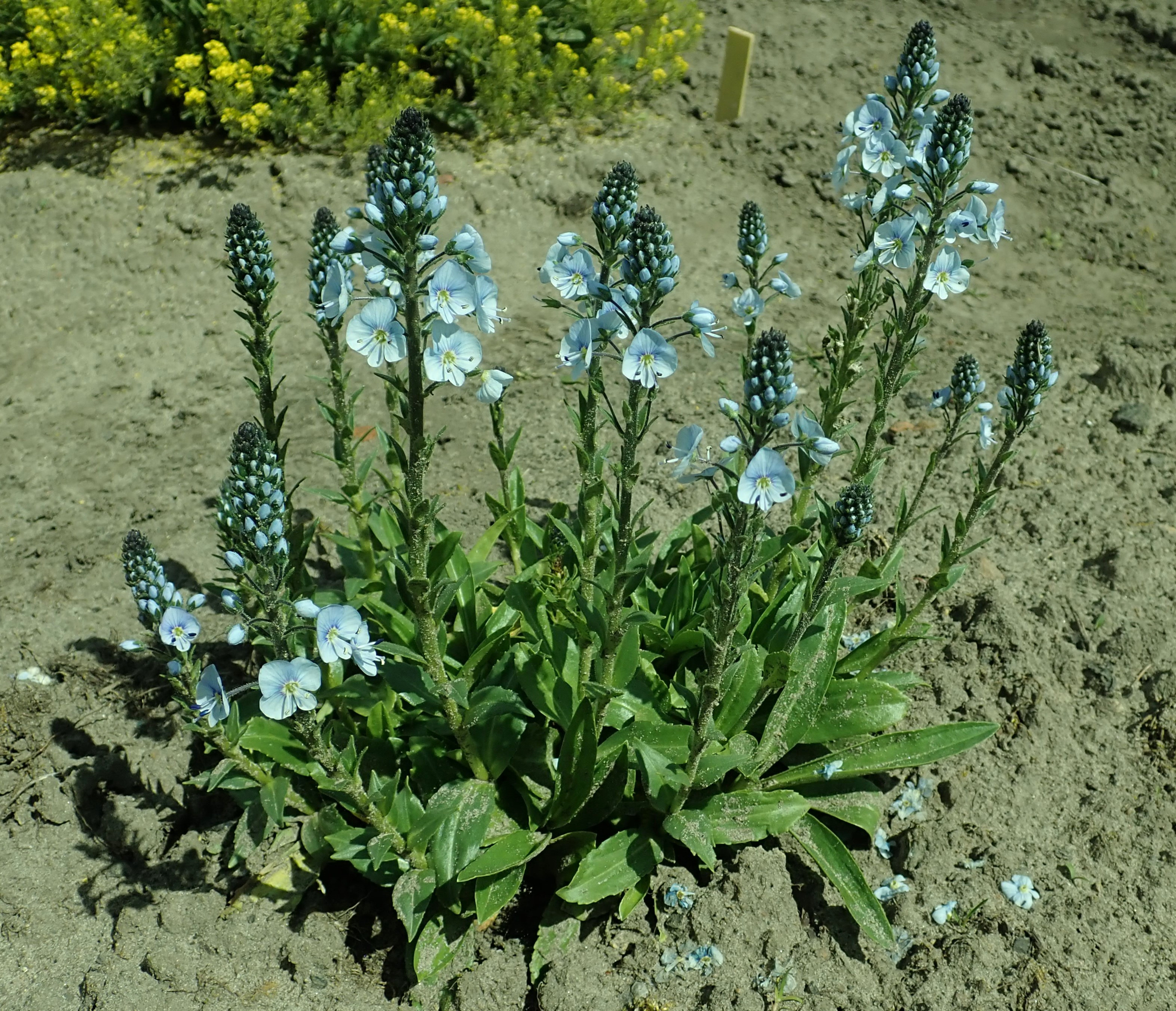

Scientific classification
- Kingdom: Plantae
- Clade: Tracheophytes
- Clade: Angiosperms
- Clade: Eudicots
- Clade: Asterids
- Order: Lamiales
- Family: Plantaginaceae
- Genus: Veronica
- Species: V. gentianoides

Binomial name
- Veronica gentianoides Vahl

= Veronica gentianoides =

Species of flowering plant in the plantain family

Veronica gentianoides, the gentian speedwell, is a species of flowering perennial plant in the family Plantaginaceae found in the Middle East, from Turkey to Iran.

== Description ==
Veronica gentianoides grows from spreading above-ground rhizomes, eventually forming a mat of glossy green leaves, grouped into rosettes. Individual leaves are more or less elliptical in shape and 2–8 cm (0.8–3.1 in) long. It flowers in early summer, producing narrow erect spikes (racemes) up to 30–40 cm (12–16 in) tall, with blue flowers which are 10–16 mm (0.4–0.6 in) across. The species is very variable. Flowers can be from almost white to deep blue; plants growing at high altitudes are considerably shorter, possibly only 5–10 cm (2–4 in) tall, with smaller leaves.

The species is found in Turkey, the Caucasus and Iran, where it grows in damp, relatively open habitats, including forests, grassland and alpine areas up to 3,600 m (11,800 ft).

== Cultivation ==
It is grown in temperate climates as an ornamental plant, particularly by alpine gardeners. Some cultivars are available, including 'Nana' (which may just be a smaller high altitude form), 'Variegata' which has leaves marked with white, and 'Tissington White', which has very pale flowers.
