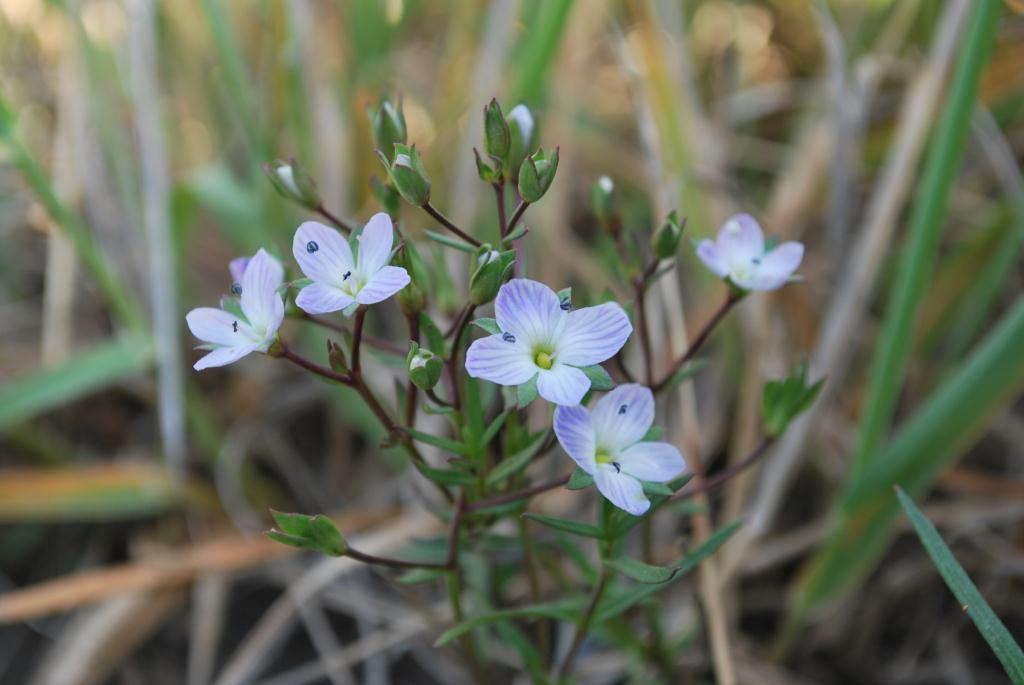
- Veronica gracilis growing in Derrimut, Melbourne

Scientific classification
- Kingdom: Plantae
- Clade: Embryophytes
- Clade: Tracheophytes
- Clade: Spermatophytes
- Clade: Angiosperms
- Clade: Eudicots
- Clade: Asterids
- Order: Lamiales
- Family: Plantaginaceae
- Genus: Veronica
- Species: V. gracilis

Binomial name
- Veronica gracilis R.Br.

Synonyms
- Veronica gracilis R.Br.var. gracilis

= Veronica gracilis =

Slender speedwell

Species of flowering plant

Veronica gracilis is a flowering plant belonging to the family Plantaginaceae, commonly known as slender speedwell. It is a perennial herb with slender branches, variable shaped leaves and small lilac flowers in spring and summer.

== Description ==
Veronica gracilis is a slender groundcover perennial herb 15–60 cm (5.9–23.6 in) high, 1 m (3 ft 3 in) wide and spreading by underground rhizomes. The erect stems grow from the rhizome at ground level and are covered with short, stiff, soft hairs. The narrow lance-shaped leaves are oppositely arranged in pairs, 1–3 cm (0.39–1.18 in) long and 1.5–9 mm (0.059–0.354 in) wide tapering at the apex and the petiole 1–2 mm (0.039–0.079 in) long. The leaf margins are smooth or sometimes with a few sharp teeth, the edges rolled up-ward or spreading. The racemes grow laterally in a cluster of 1-6 cup-shaped flowers in leaf axils on the upper part of stems, usually on a peduncle 15–20 mm (0.59–0.79 in) long. The flower petals are pale mauve or blue with purple veins. The flower bracts are 4–6 mm (0.16–0.24 in) long, pedicels 15 mm (0.59 in) long and calyx lobes 7.5–8 mm (0.30–0.31 in) long. The shiny seed capsule is egg-shaped 3–4 mm (0.12–0.16 in) long, 2–3 mm (0.079–0.118 in) wide with stiff fine backward arching hairs and notched at the apex. Flowers from September to December.

== Taxonomy and naming ==
Veronica gracilis was first formally described in 1810 by Robert Brown and published the description in Prodromus florae Novae Hollandiae et insulae Van-Diemen, exhibens characteres plantarum quas annis 1802–1805. The specific epithet (gracilis) is a Latin word meaning "slender" and "thin".

== Distribution and habitat ==
Slender speedwell is a widespread Australian species. In New South Wales it grows mainly on the northern and southern tablelands. In Victoria a widespread species across the state. In South Australia a rare species occurring in three localities on coastal fringes. A common widespread species in the Australian Capital Territory. Found growing in all distributions in wet well drained soils, grassland and eucalypt woodland in either full sun or heavily shaded positions.
