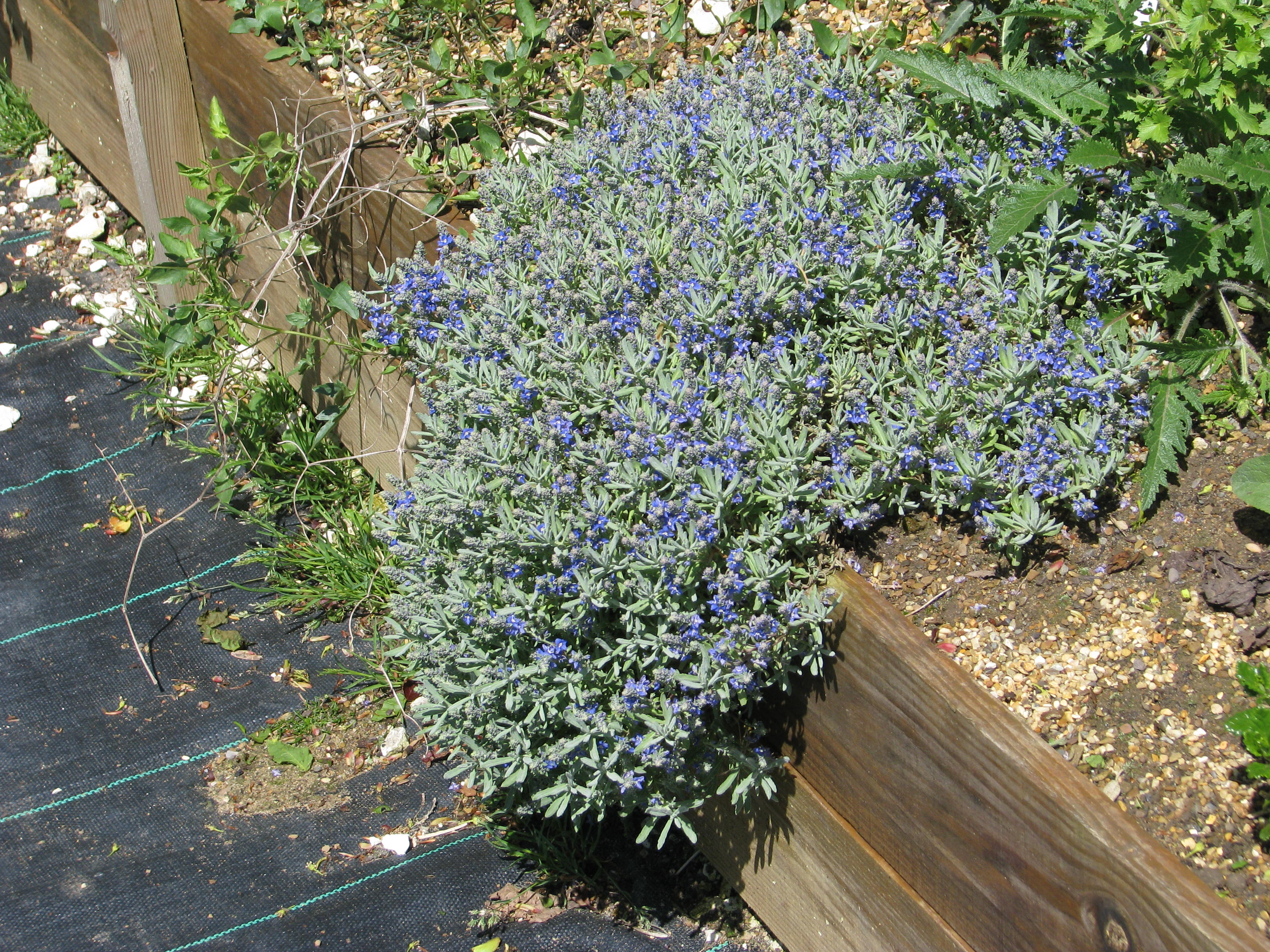
- In a garden setting
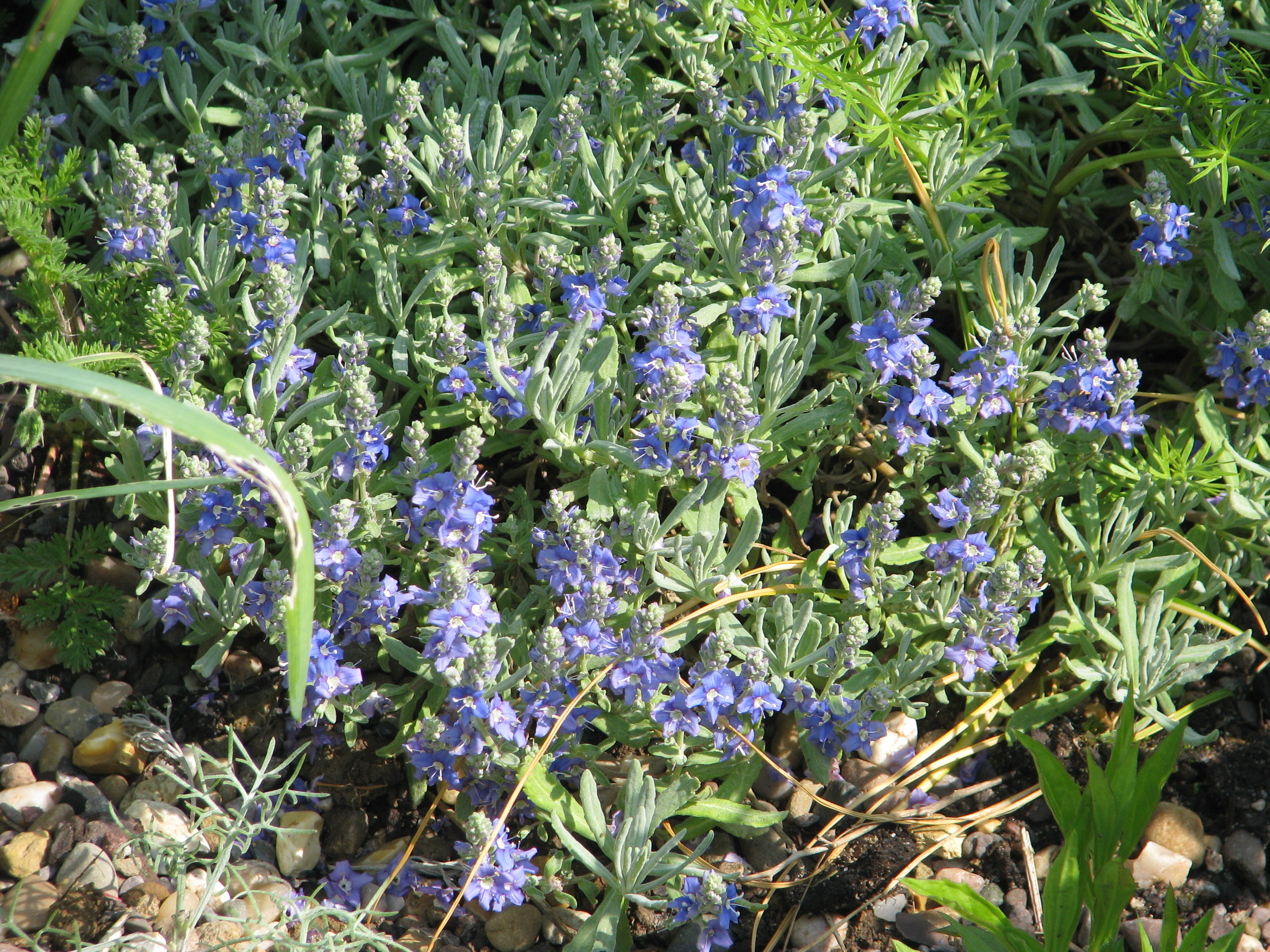
- Close-up of flowers

Scientific classification
- Kingdom: Plantae
- Clade: Embryophytes
- Clade: Tracheophytes
- Clade: Spermatophytes
- Clade: Angiosperms
- Clade: Eudicots
- Clade: Asterids
- Order: Lamiales
- Family: Plantaginaceae
- Genus: Veronica
- Species: V. cinerea

Binomial name
- Veronica cinerea Boiss. & Balansa

= Veronica cinerea =

Species of flowering plant

Veronica cinerea, called the ash-coloured speedwell, is a species of flowering plant in the genus Veronica, native to Turkey and Lebanon/Syria. An evergreen, mat‑forming perennial useful as a ground cover, it has gained the Royal Horticultural Society's Award of Garden Merit.
