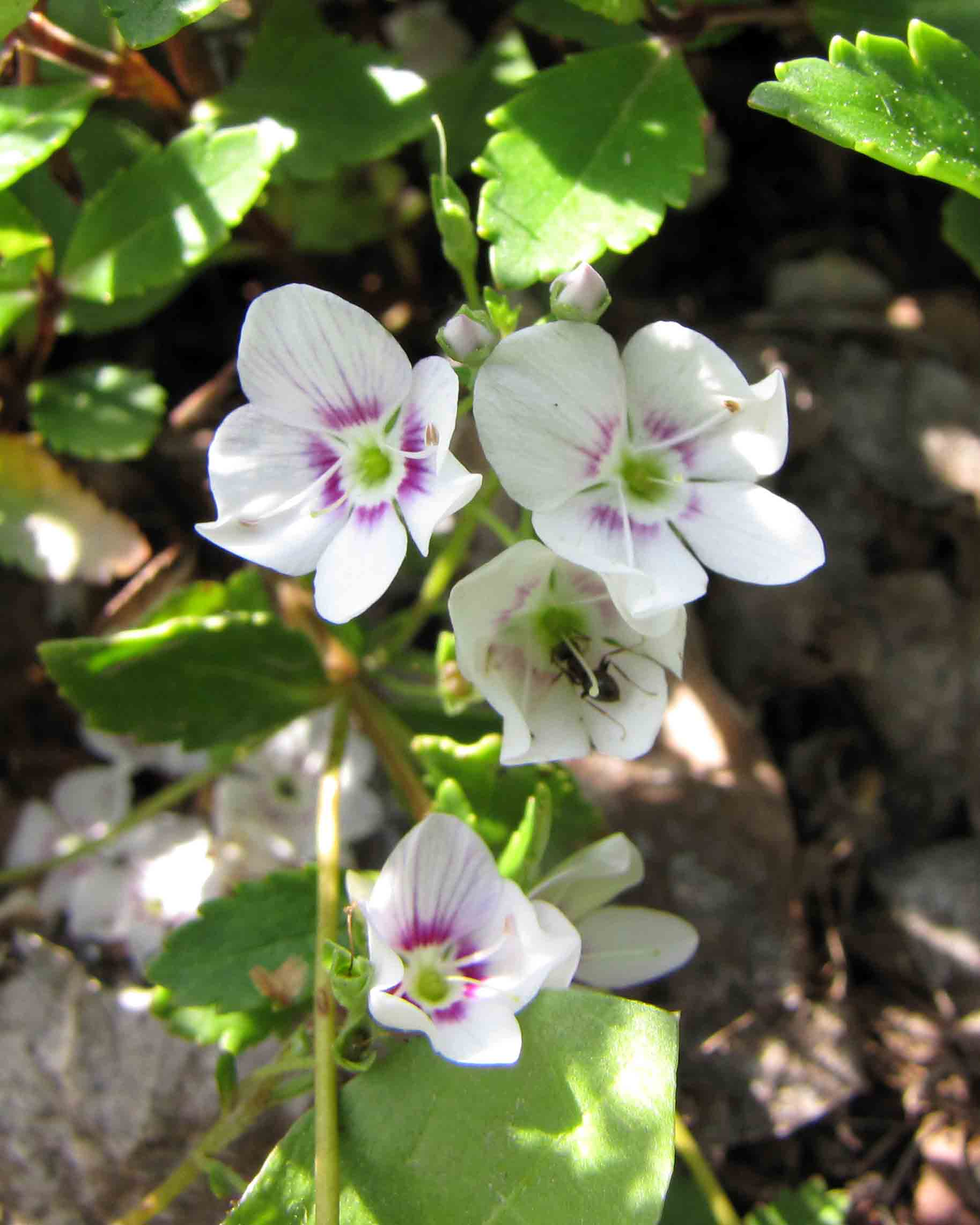
- Flowers

Scientific classification
- Kingdom: Plantae
- Clade: Tracheophytes
- Clade: Angiosperms
- Clade: Eudicots
- Clade: Asterids
- Order: Lamiales
- Family: Plantaginaceae
- Genus: Veronica
- Species: V. lyallii

Binomial name
- Veronica lyallii Hook.f.

Synonyms
- Hebe lyallii (Hook.f.) A.Wall; Parahebe lyallii (Hook.f.) W.R.B.Oliv.

= Veronica lyallii =

Species of flowering plant

Veronica lyallii is a species of flowering plant in the family Plantaginaceae, native to New Zealand. Under its synonym Parahebe lyallii, its cultivar 'Julie-Anne' has gained the Royal Horticultural Society's Award of Garden Merit.
