= Veronica ovata =

Scientific classification
- Kingdom: Plantae
- Clade: Tracheophytes
- Clade: Angiosperms
- Clade: Eudicots
- Clade: Asterids
- Order: Lamiales
- Family: Plantaginaceae
- Genus: Veronica
- Species: V. ovata

Binomial name
- Veronica ovata Nakai

Species of plant

Veronica ovata is a species of flowering plant in the family Plantaginaceae. It is native to eastern Asia, including eastern China, Korea, and Japan.

== Subspecies ==
Kew's Plants of the World Online database accepts the following subspecies:

- V. o. subsp. japonica
- V. o. subsp. kiusiana
- V. o. subsp. maritima
- V. o. subsp. miyabei
- V. o. subsp. ovata

Other subspecies include:

- V. o. canescens
- V. o. villosa
