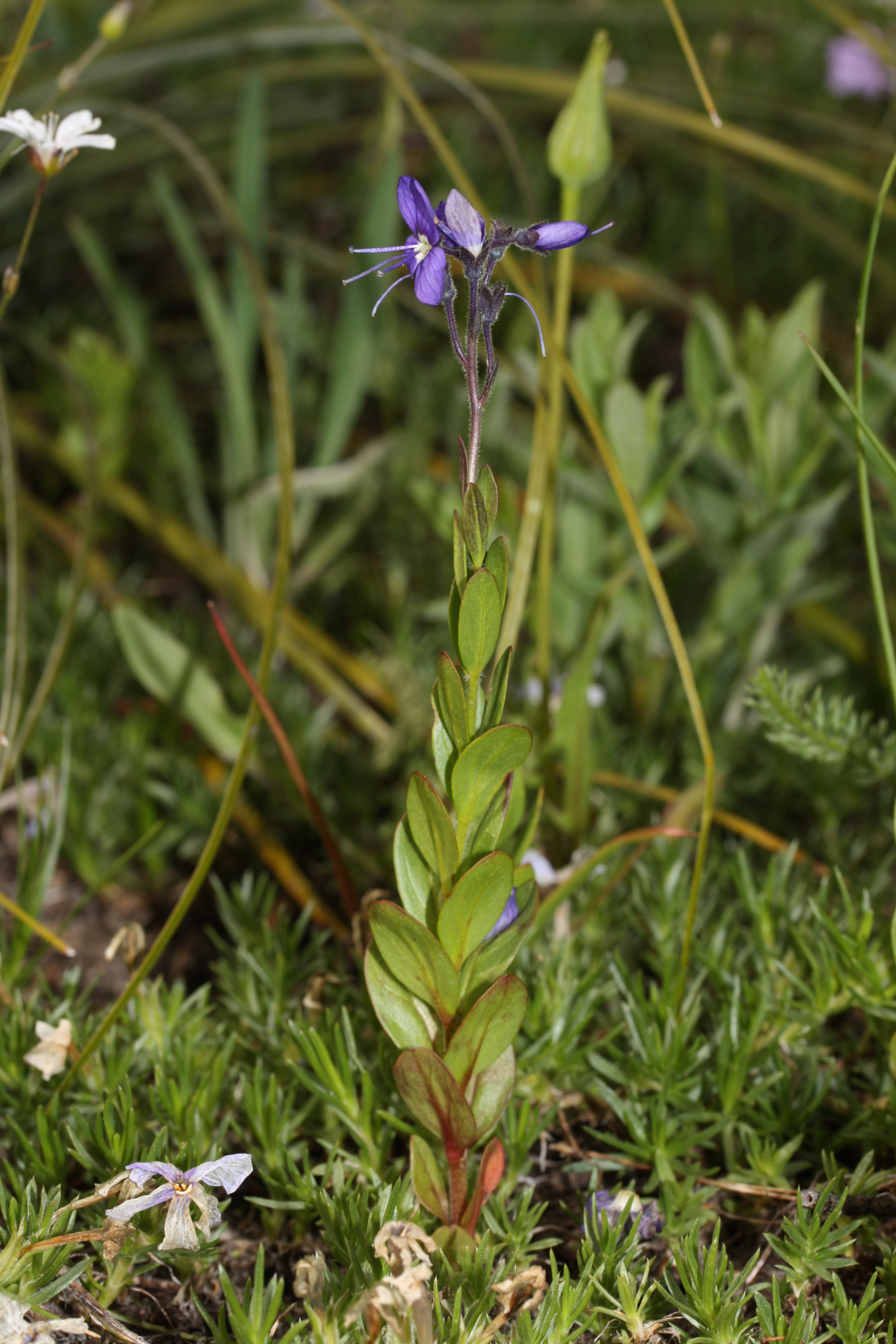

Scientific classification
- Kingdom: Plantae
- Clade: Tracheophytes
- Clade: Angiosperms
- Clade: Eudicots
- Clade: Asterids
- Order: Lamiales
- Family: Plantaginaceae
- Genus: Veronica
- Species: V. cusickii

Binomial name
- Veronica cusickii A.Gray

= Veronica cusickii =

Species of flowering plant

Veronica cusickii is a species of flowering plant in the plantain family known by the common name Cusick's speedwell. It is native to western North America from British Columbia to Montana to northern California, where it occurs in mountain meadows and forests.

It is a rhizomatous perennial herb producing a hairy, glandular, erect, or upright stem up to 15 or 20 centimeters (5.9 or 7.9 in) tall. The oval leaves are oppositely arranged in pairs about the stem, each blade measuring up to 2.5 centimeters in length. The inflorescence is a terminal raceme of flowers borne on hairy, glandular pedicels. Each flower has dark, hairy sepals and a flat corolla about a centimeter wide or slightly wider. The flower corolla has four deep blue-purple lobes with whitish bases, the top lobe being the largest since it is actually a fusion of two lobes. At the center are two long, protruding stamens.
