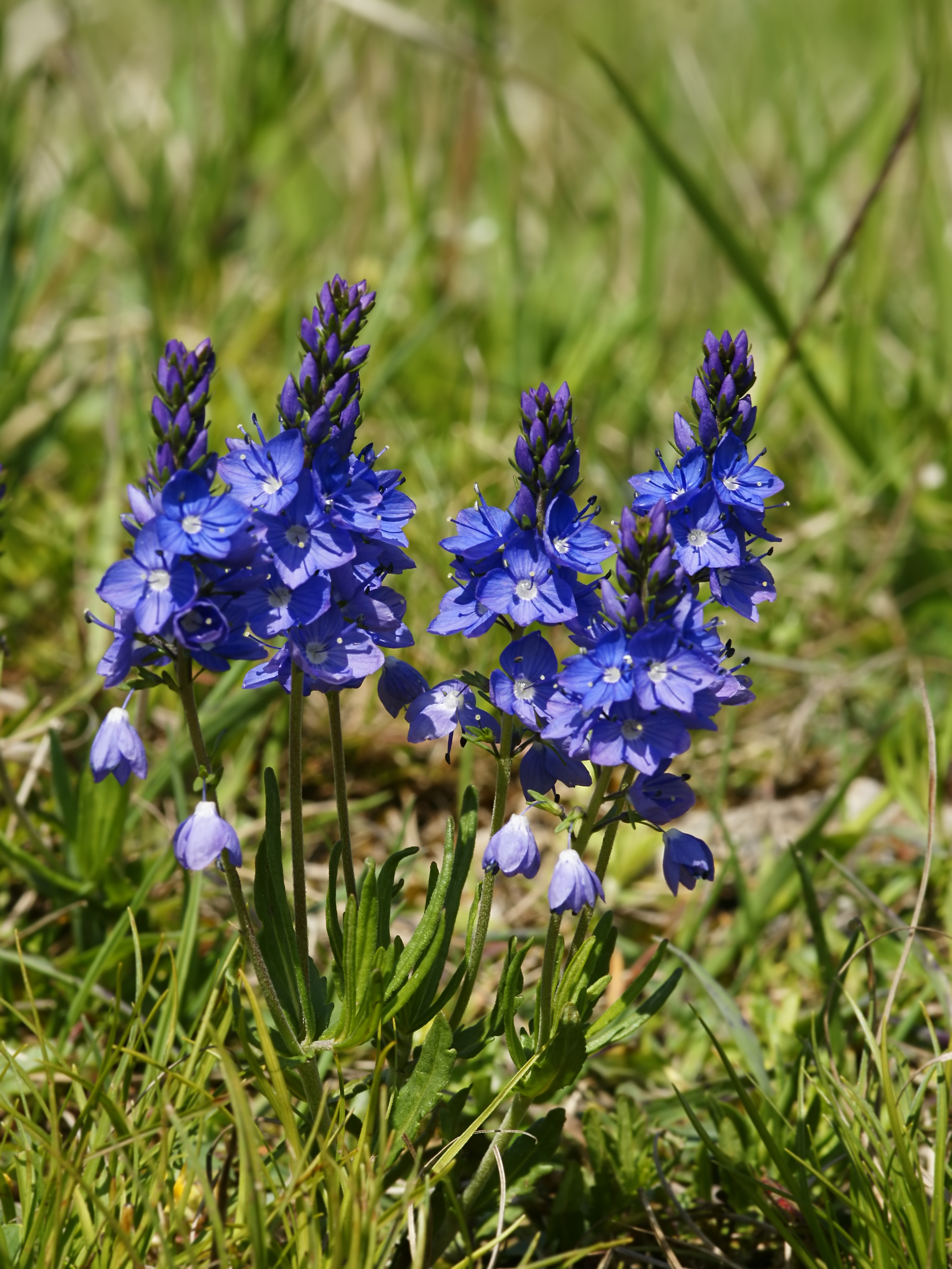

Scientific classification
- Kingdom: Plantae
- Clade: Embryophytes
- Clade: Tracheophytes
- Clade: Spermatophytes
- Clade: Angiosperms
- Clade: Eudicots
- Clade: Asterids
- Order: Lamiales
- Family: Plantaginaceae
- Genus: Veronica
- Species: V. prostrata

Binomial name
- Veronica prostrata L. (1762)

= Veronica prostrata =

Species of flowering plant

Veronica prostrata, the prostrate speedwell or rock speedwell, is a species of flowering plant in the family Plantaginaceae, native to Europe. Growing to 10–15 cm (4–6 in) tall, it is a temperate semi-evergreen prostrate perennial plant. As it forms a mat of foliage, it is suitable for groundcover or in the alpine garden. Blue flowers are borne in summer, in terminal racemes above paired leaves.

This plant and its cultivar 'Spode Blue' have both gained the Royal Horticultural Society's Award of Garden Merit.
