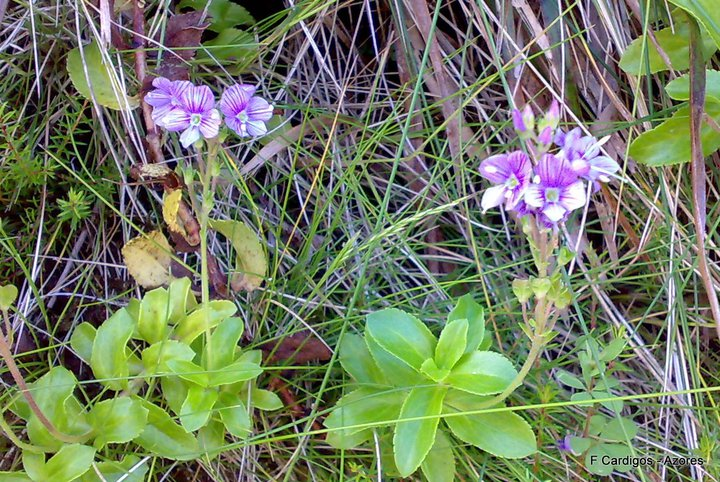

Scientific classification
- Kingdom: Plantae
- Clade: Tracheophytes
- Clade: Angiosperms
- Clade: Eudicots
- Clade: Asterids
- Order: Lamiales
- Family: Plantaginaceae
- Genus: Veronica
- Species: V. dabneyi

Binomial name
- Veronica dabneyi Hochst.

= Veronica dabneyi =

Species of flowering plant

Veronica dabneyi, the Azores speedwell, is a flowering plant species of the family Plantaginaceae, endemic to the Azores. It inhabits very humid rocky slopes, and also close to waterfalls and lake margins, at altitudes between 200 and 600 m (660 and 1,970 ft). It is present only in the Western Group of islands (Corvo and Flores). It was thought to be extinct as it had not been observed since 1938, but was rediscovered in 1999, making it a Lazarus taxon.
