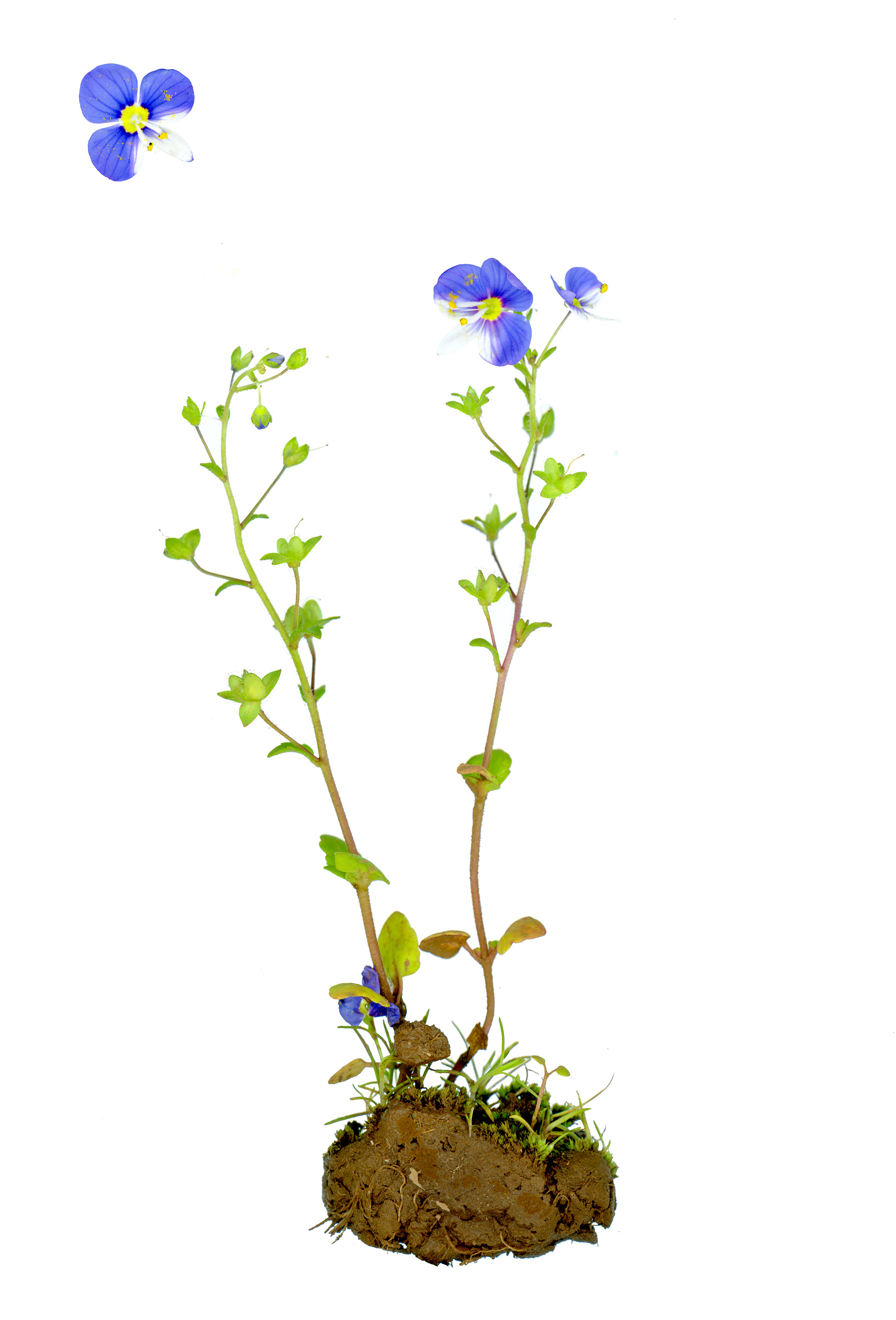

Scientific classification
- Kingdom: Plantae
- Clade: Embryophytes
- Clade: Tracheophytes
- Clade: Spermatophytes
- Clade: Angiosperms
- Clade: Eudicots
- Clade: Asterids
- Order: Lamiales
- Family: Plantaginaceae
- Genus: Veronica
- Species: V. syriaca

Binomial name
- Veronica syriaca Roem. & Schult.

= Veronica syriaca =

Species of flowering plant

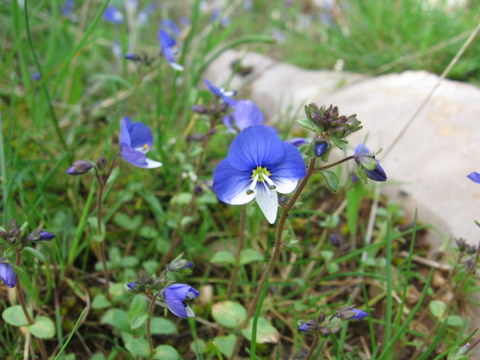
Veronica syriaca

Veronica syriaca, the Syrian speedwell, is a flowering plant species in the family Plantaginaceae.

== Description ==
It is an annual plant. It is pubescent-glandular and up to 10–30 centimetres (4–12 in) tall. The leaves are ovate, crenulate or dentate.

Blooming from January to May, the flowers are in loose racemes. The bracts are linear and entire. The pedicels are filiform, spreading-erect, sometimes recurved at the apex. The calyx lobes are ovate-Ianceolate, 2–3 millimetres (1/16–1/8 in). The corolla is blue and white, 8–15 mm (3/8–5/8 in) in diameter.

== Etymology ==
The generic name of this flower is of unknown origin. Some think it is a distortion of betonica, the Latin name of a species of Labiates; others consider that it refers to Saint Veronica who handed a cloth to Christ to wipe the perspiration from his face.

== Distribution and habitat ==
It is distributed in Syria, Lebanon, Egypt and Turkey. It appears on the coast, the lower and middle mountains, and eastern slope of Beqaa of Lebanon, Hennon. It can be found in fields and gardens.
