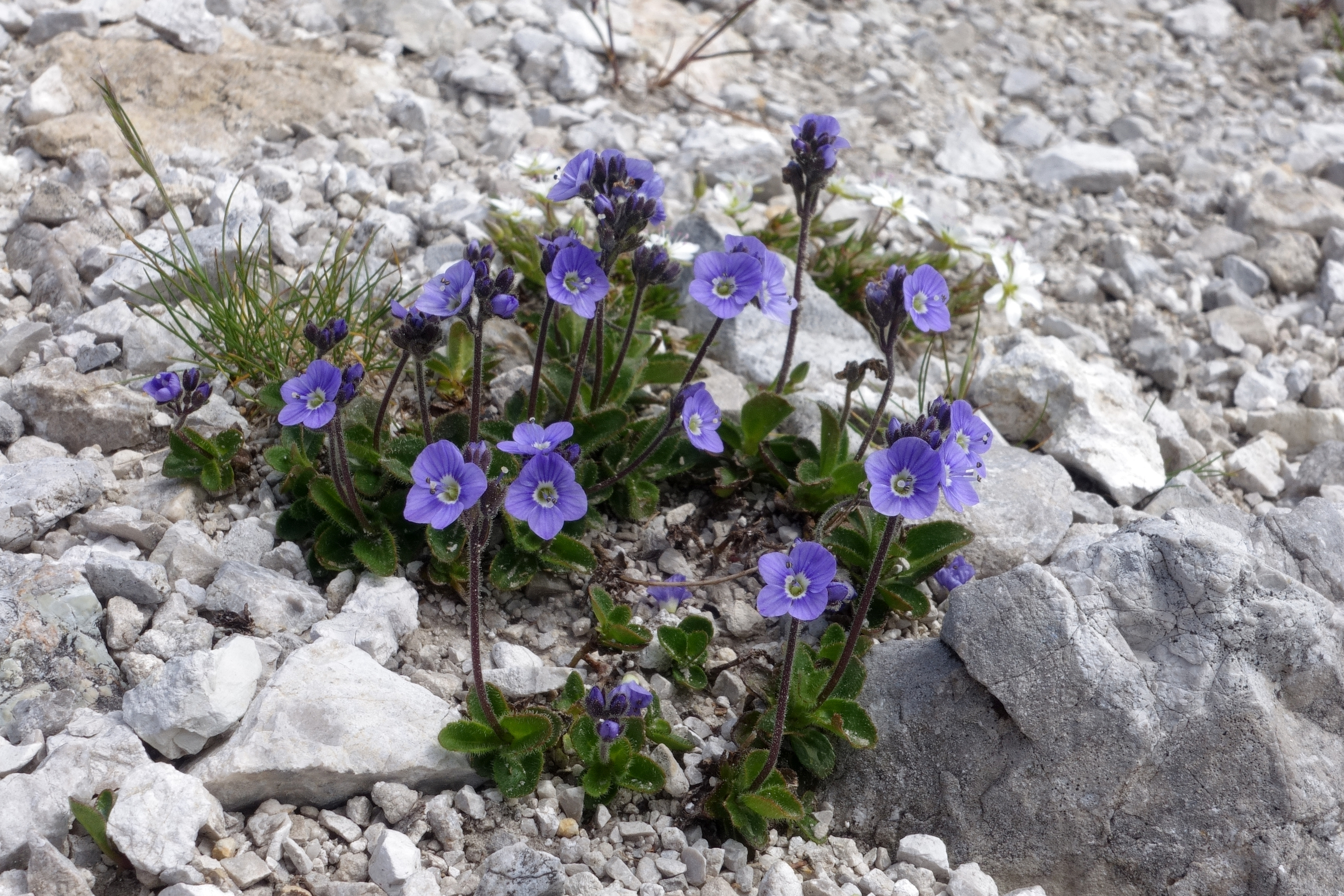
- Veronica aphylla at the Giardino Botanico Alpino Chanousia

Scientific classification
- Kingdom: Plantae
- Clade: Embryophytes
- Clade: Tracheophytes
- Clade: Spermatophytes
- Clade: Angiosperms
- Clade: Eudicots
- Clade: Asterids
- Order: Lamiales
- Family: Plantaginaceae
- Genus: Veronica
- Species: V. aphylla

Binomial name
- Veronica aphylla L.

= Veronica aphylla =

Species of flowering plant

Veronica aphylla, common name leafless stemmed speedwell, is a flowering plant belonging to the family Plantaginaceae.

== Description ==
Veronica aphylla can reach a height of 3–8 centimetres (1.2–3.1 in). It is a perennial herbaceous plant with a single, erect, cylindrical, hairy, greenish, flowering stem. It forms a basal rosette of green, elliptical or oval, pubescent leaves, 4–10 millimetres (0.16–0.39 in) wide and 8–15 millimetres (0.31–0.59 in) long. Flowers have four blue light petals with darker nerves and two long stamens. They bloom from July to August.

== Distribution ==
This species is native to the mountains of Central and Southern Europe (Alps, Jura, Carpathians, Iberian Peninsula and the Balkans).

== Habitat ==
Veronica aphylla prefers alpine pastures, stony slopes and rocky areas, at elevation of 1,500–2,800 metres (4,900–9,200 ft) above sea level.
