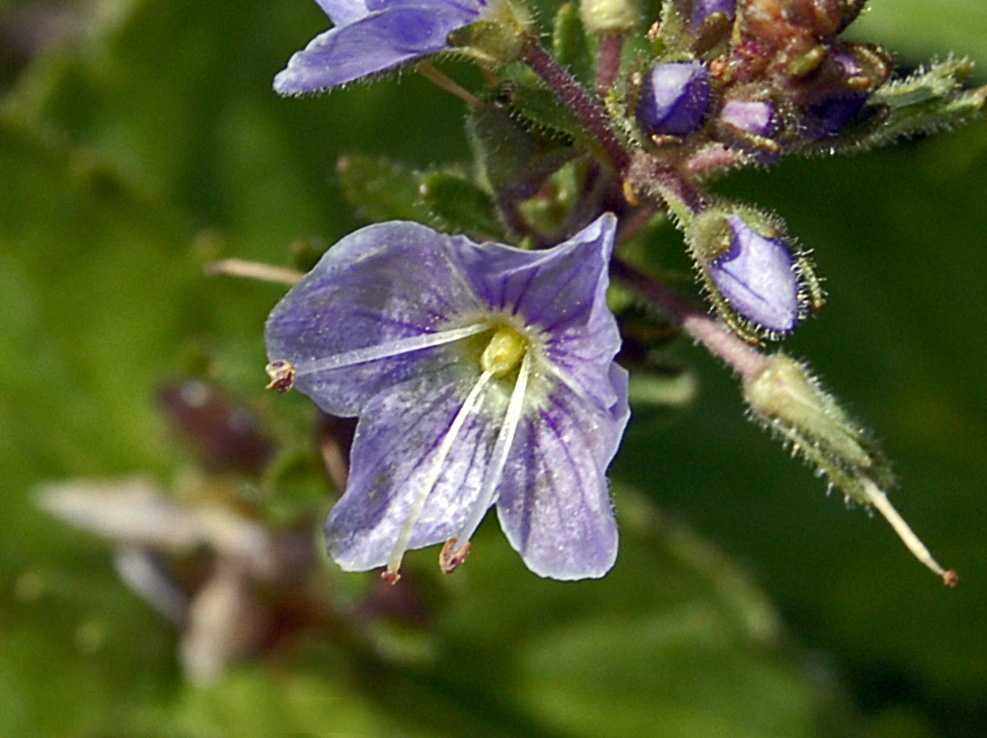
- Close-up on a flower of Veronica ponae

Scientific classification
- Kingdom: Plantae
- Clade: Tracheophytes
- Clade: Angiosperms
- Clade: Eudicots
- Clade: Asterids
- Order: Lamiales
- Family: Plantaginaceae
- Genus: Veronica
- Species: V. ponae

Binomial name
- Veronica ponae Gouan

Synonyms
- Cardia serrata Dulac; Ponaria ponae Rafin.; Veronica bolosiana Font Quer; Veronica gouani Moretti; Veronica sempervirens Lam.

= Veronica ponae =

Species of flowering plant in the plantain family

Veronica ponae is a flowering plant belonging to the family Plantaginaceae.

== Distribution ==
This species is present in the Pyrenees of southwestern France and in northeastern Spain, at an elevation of 800–2,900 metres (2,600–9,500 ft) above sea level.

== Description ==
Veronica ponae can reach a height of 10–40 centimetres (4–16 in). These small perennial, herbaceous plants are creeping and pubescent, with ascending, simple stems. Leaves are oblong, lanceolate to oval, opposite, sessile and strongly serrated. Flowers are small, blue or purple lilac, in elongated terminal clusters. They bloom from June to September.

== Gallery ==
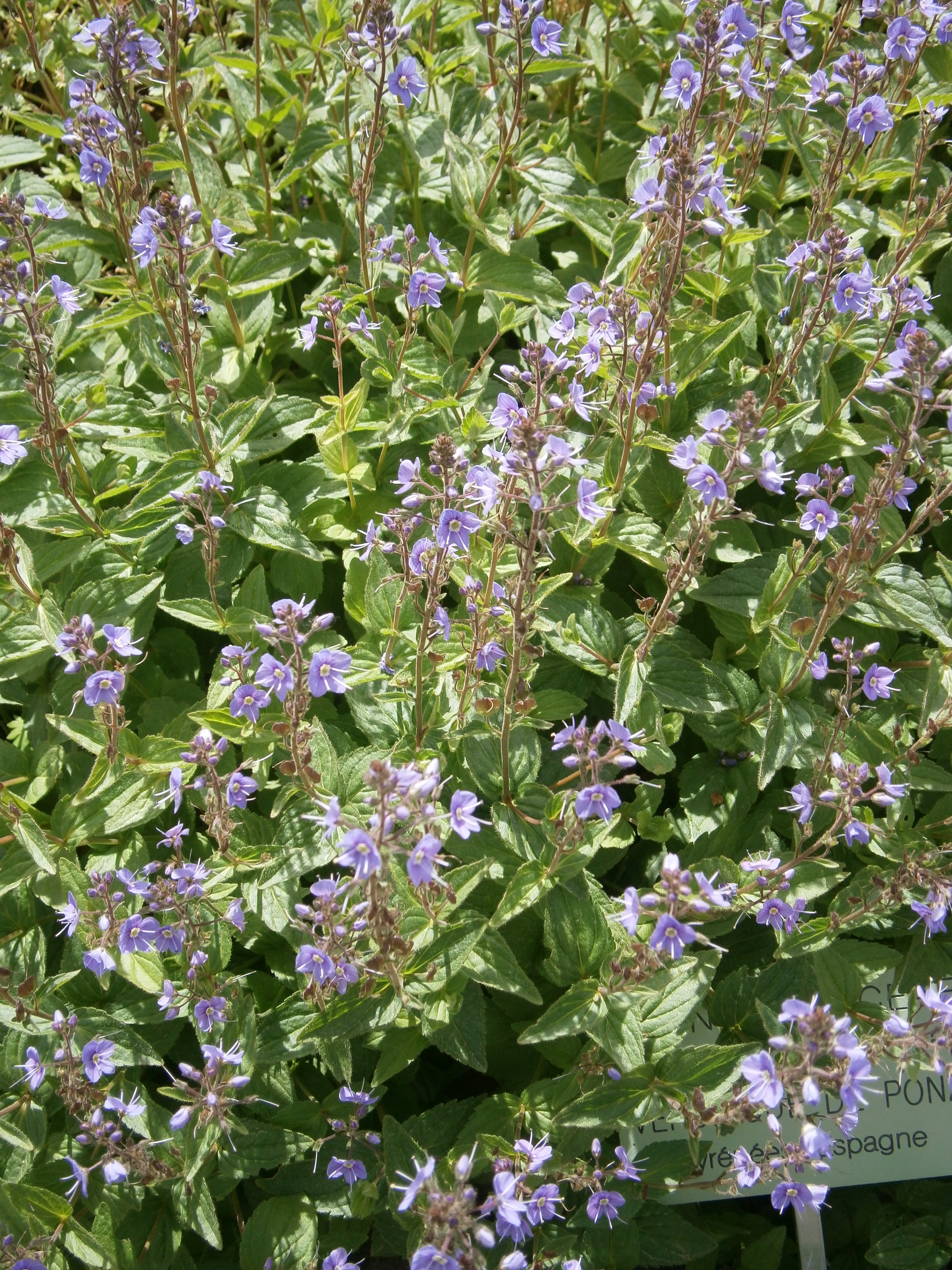
Plants of Veronica ponae

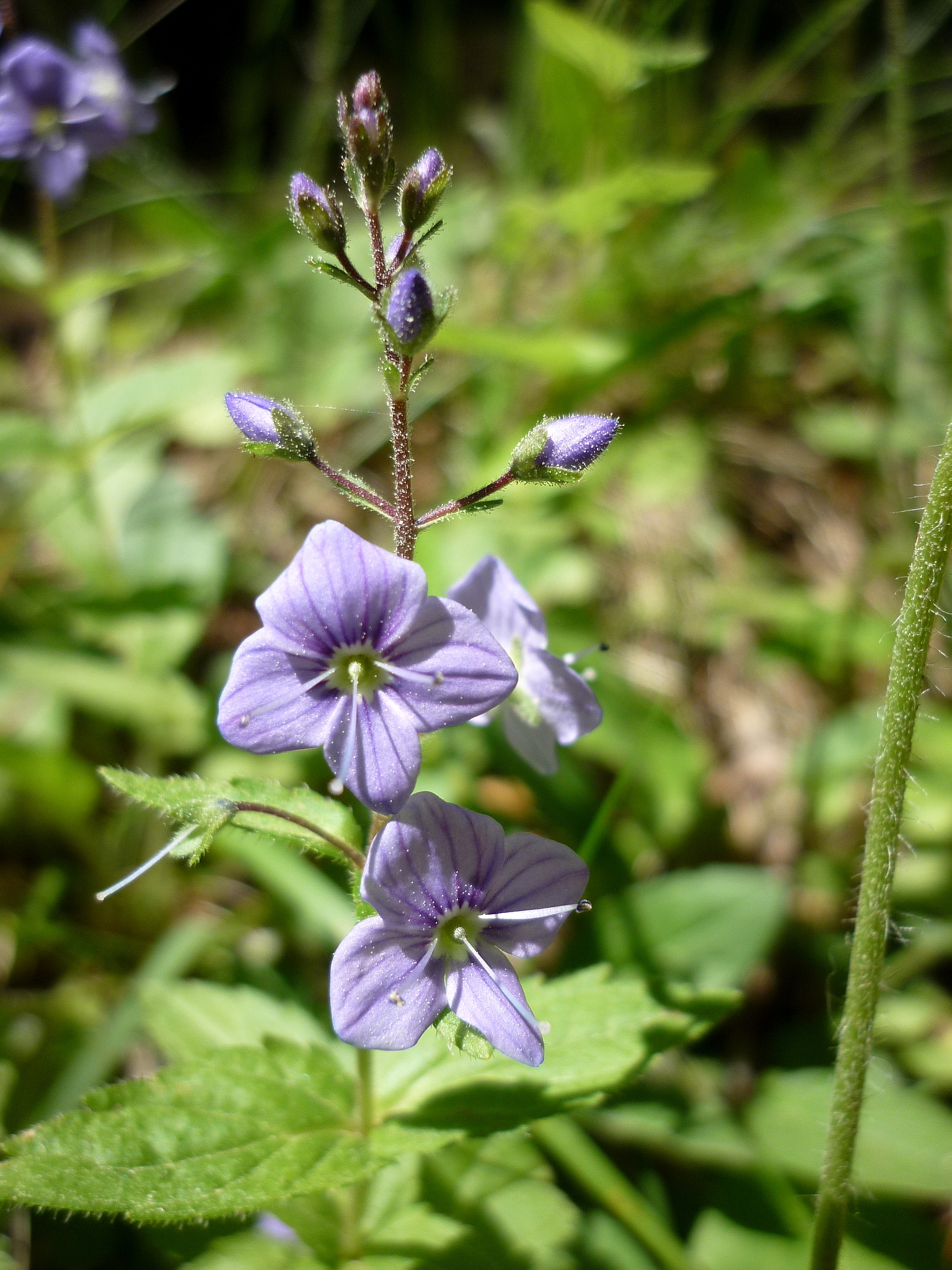
Flowers of Veronica ponae
