= Veronica mannii =

Conservation status
- Near Threatened (IUCN 2.3)

Scientific classification
- Kingdom: Plantae
- Clade: Embryophytes
- Clade: Tracheophytes
- Clade: Spermatophytes
- Clade: Angiosperms
- Clade: Eudicots
- Clade: Asterids
- Order: Lamiales
- Family: Plantaginaceae
- Genus: Veronica
- Species: V. mannii

Binomial name
- Veronica mannii Hook.f.

Species of flowering plant

Veronica mannii is a species of flowering plant in the family Plantaginaceae. It is found in Cameroon and Equatorial Guinea. Its natural habitat is subtropical or tropical dry lowland grassland.
