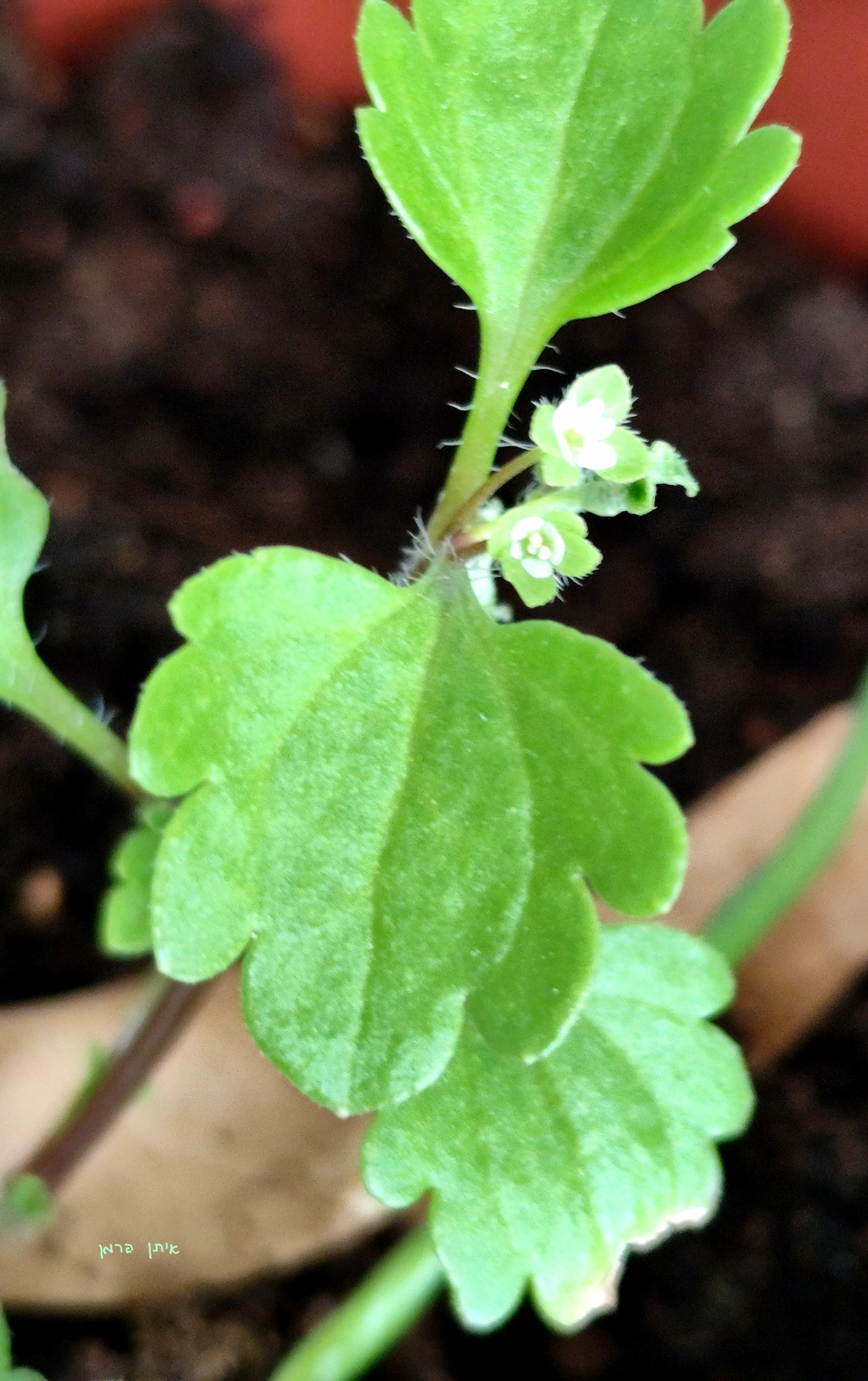

Scientific classification
- Kingdom: Plantae
- Clade: Tracheophytes
- Clade: Angiosperms
- Clade: Eudicots
- Clade: Asterids
- Order: Lamiales
- Family: Plantaginaceae
- Genus: Veronica
- Species: V. panormitana

Binomial name
- Veronica panormitana Tineo ex Guss.

Synonyms
- Veronica cymbalaria var. panormitana

= Veronica panormitana =

Species of plant

Veronica panormitana is a species of flowering plant in the family Plantaginaceae.

== Sources ==
This article incorporates text from a free content work. Licensed under CC0 (license statement/permission). Text taken from Veronica panormitana. Encyclopedia of Life.
