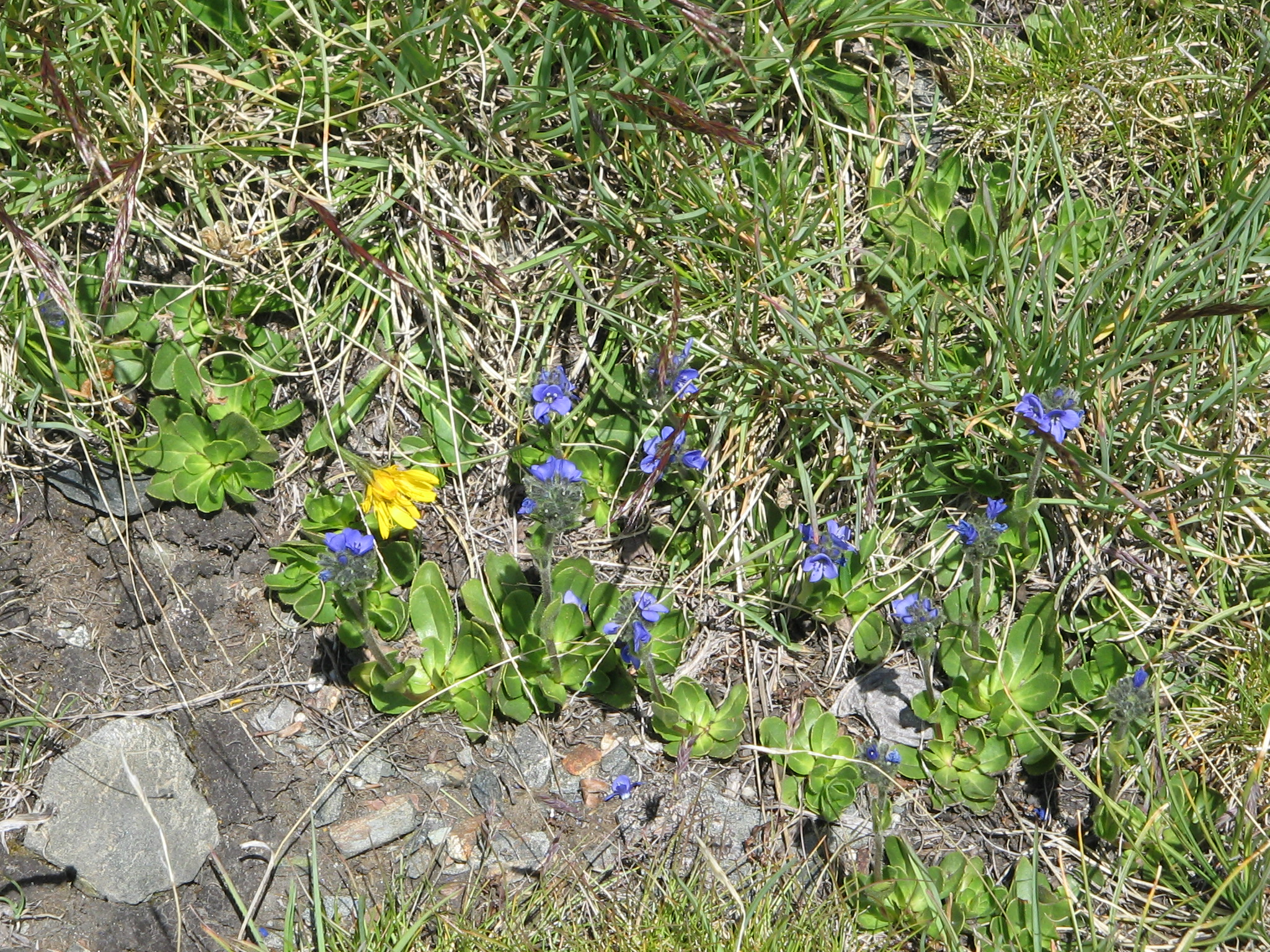

Scientific classification
- Kingdom: Plantae
- Clade: Tracheophytes
- Clade: Angiosperms
- Clade: Eudicots
- Clade: Asterids
- Order: Lamiales
- Family: Plantaginaceae
- Genus: Veronica
- Species: V. bellidioides

Binomial name
- Veronica bellidioides L.

Synonyms
- Veronica townsendi Gremli ex Dalla Torre; Veronica lilacina Townsend; Veronica bellidioides subsp. lilacina (Townsend) Nyman; Veronica bellidioides f. lilacina (Towns.) B.Bock; Veronica bellidifolia ex Rompp; Cardia obtusifolia Dulac

= Veronica bellidioides =

Species of flowering plant

Veronica bellidioides is a flowering plant species in the genus Veronica of the family Plantaginaceae. It is native to Europe. This species was described by Carl von Linné.
