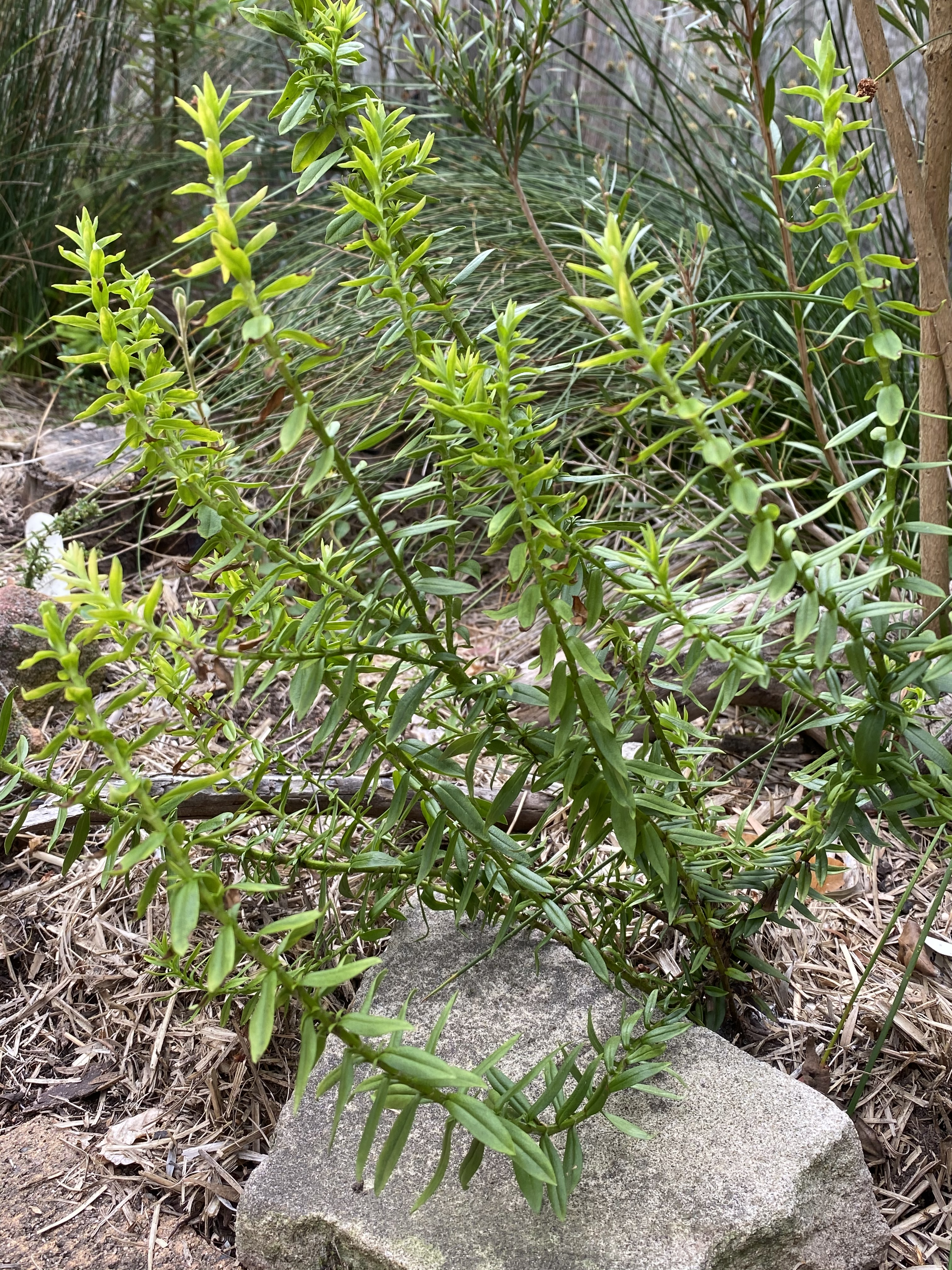

Scientific classification
- Kingdom: Plantae
- Clade: Embryophytes
- Clade: Tracheophytes
- Clade: Spermatophytes
- Clade: Angiosperms
- Clade: Eudicots
- Clade: Asterids
- Order: Lamiales
- Family: Plantaginaceae
- Genus: Veronica
- Species: V. continua

Binomial name
- Veronica continua B.G.Briggs

= Veronica continua =

Species of flowering plant

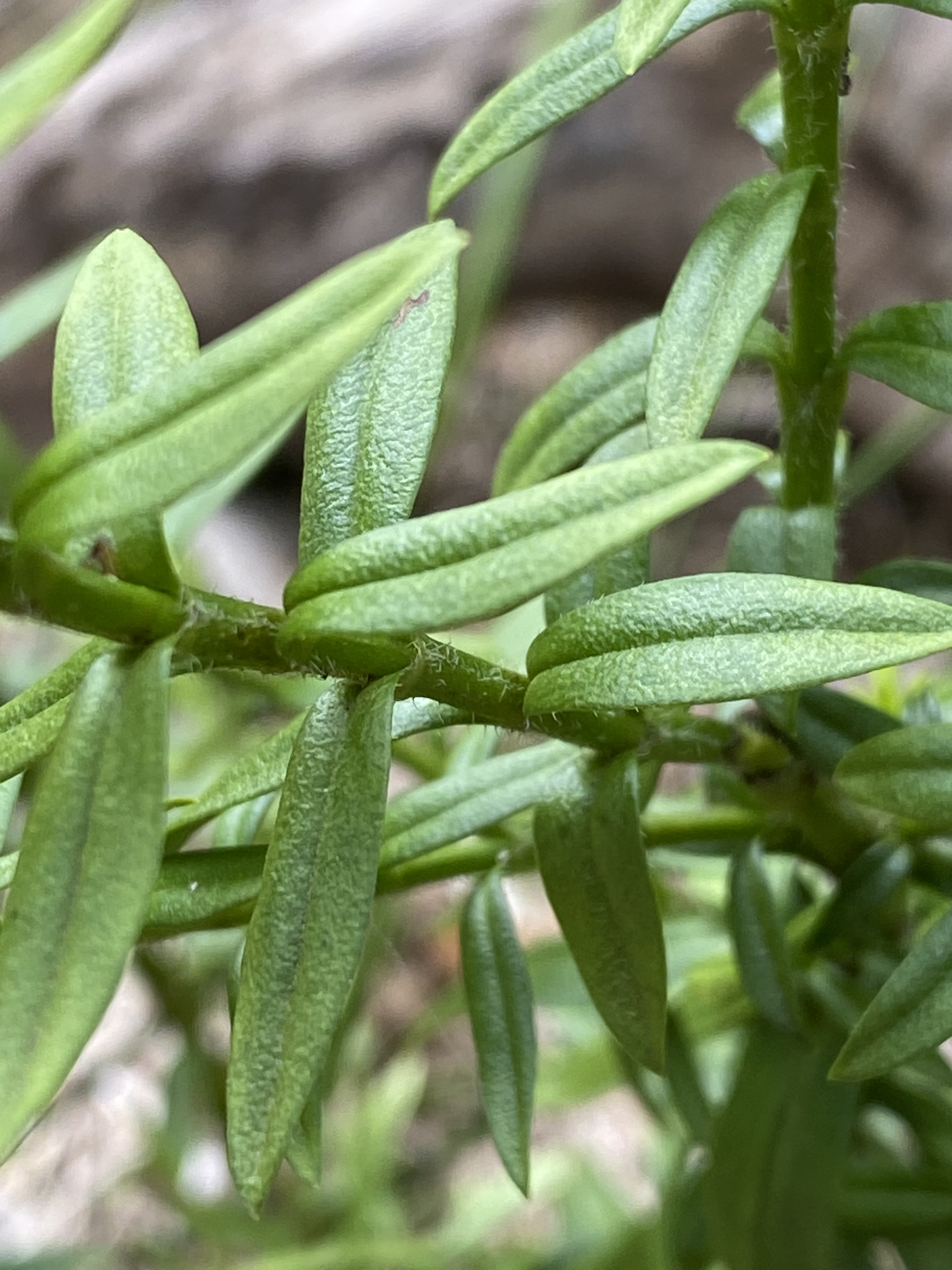
Foliage

Veronica continua is an upright, woody herb with blue flowers in dense clusters at the end of branches and leaves arranged in opposite pairs. It is endemic to Tasmania.

== Description ==
Veronica continua is an erect, quite common woody herb to 1.5 m (4 ft 11 in) high, multi-stemmed, 1-8 per plant, and few branches. The leaves are arranged in opposite pairs, decussate, stem-clasping, firm, lanceolate to oblong, arched backward or spreading, 12–35 mm (0.47–1.38 in) long, 3.5–11 mm (0.14–0.43 in) wide, apex pointed and usually recurved. The leaf margin entire, smooth except for stiff white, small hairs near the base, mid-vein on upper surface impressed, prominent on the underside. The flowers arranged in racemes are borne in the upper leaf axils of new growth, 2–10 cm (0.79–3.94 in) long, 15-30 flowers in each cluster, occasionally on short lateral branches. The calyx lobes 3.5–4.7 mm (0.14–0.19 in) long, 1–1.5 mm (0.039–0.059 in) wide when fruiting, narrow-triangular and taper to a point. The blue corolla is 8–9.5 mm (0.31–0.37 in) long, upper lobes broad, egg-shaped, rounded, 6–9.5 mm (0.24–0.37 in) long, 5–7.6 mm (0.20–0.30 in) wide. Lower lobes rounded, narrowly egg-shaped, 5.5–9.5 mm (0.22–0.37 in) long and 3–6 mm (0.12–0.24 in) wide. The fruit is a smooth, shiny, flattened, broadly egg-shaped capsule, 5–7.5 mm (0.20–0.30 in) long, 6–9 mm (0.24–0.35 in) wide, apex squared or shallowly notched.

== Taxonomy and naming ==
Veronica continua was first formally described in 2006 by Barbara Briggs and the description was published in Telopea. The specific epithet (continua) means "continuous" or "unbroken" with reference to the stems continuing to grow after flowering.

== Distribution and habitat ==
This species grows on rocky hillsides, damp woodlands, occasionally wet sclerophyll forests and cliff edges in north-east Tasmania, mostly in and near Douglas-Apsley National Park.
