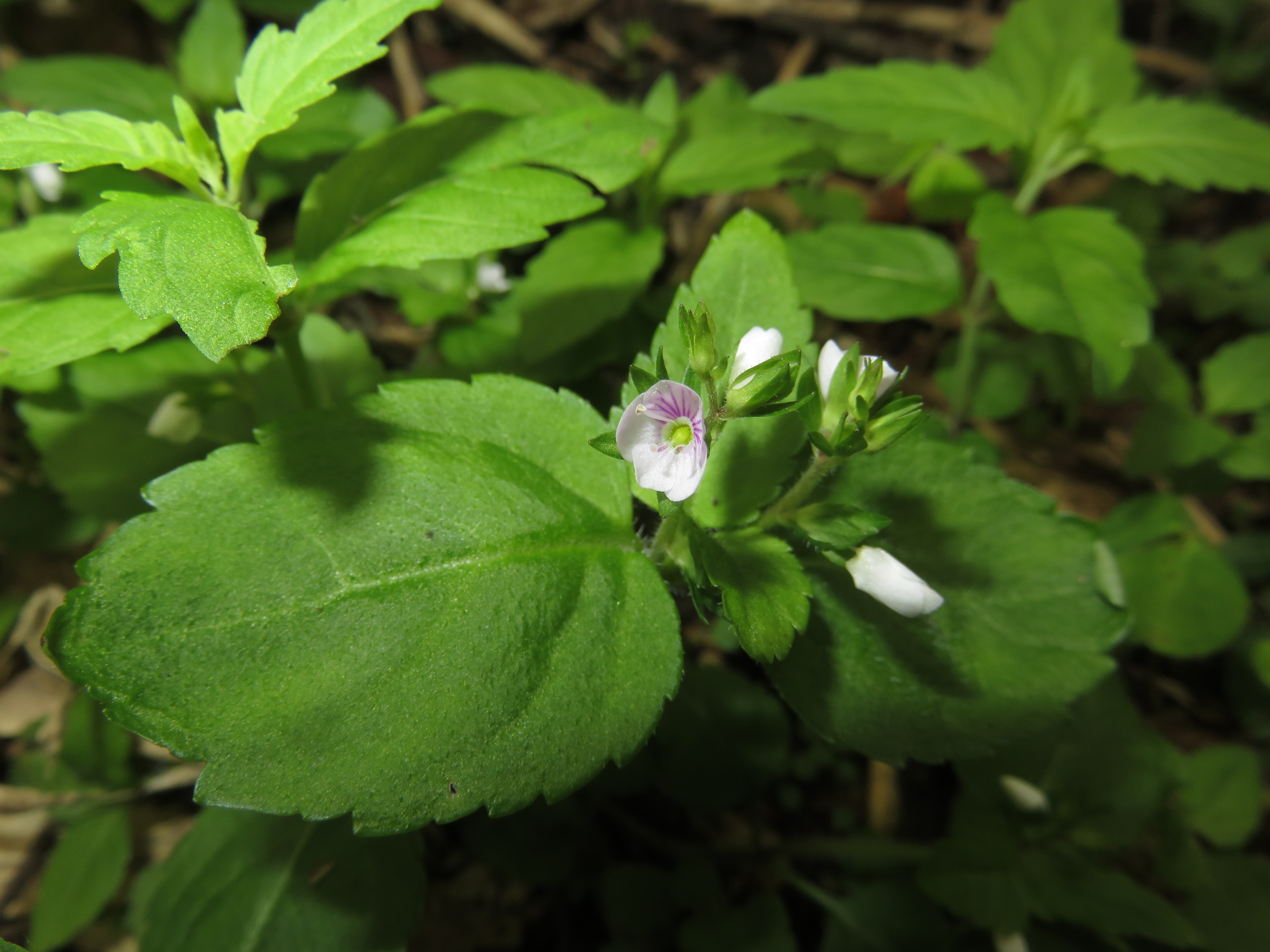

Scientific classification
- Kingdom: Plantae
- Clade: Tracheophytes
- Clade: Angiosperms
- Clade: Eudicots
- Clade: Asterids
- Order: Lamiales
- Family: Plantaginaceae
- Genus: Veronica
- Species: V. japonensis

Binomial name
- Veronica japonensis Makino

Synonyms
- Veronica cana var. decumbens Makino

= Veronica japonensis =

Species of flowering plant

Veronica japonensis is a species of flowering plant in the genus Veronica of the family Plantaginaceae. It was described by Tomitaro Makino.
