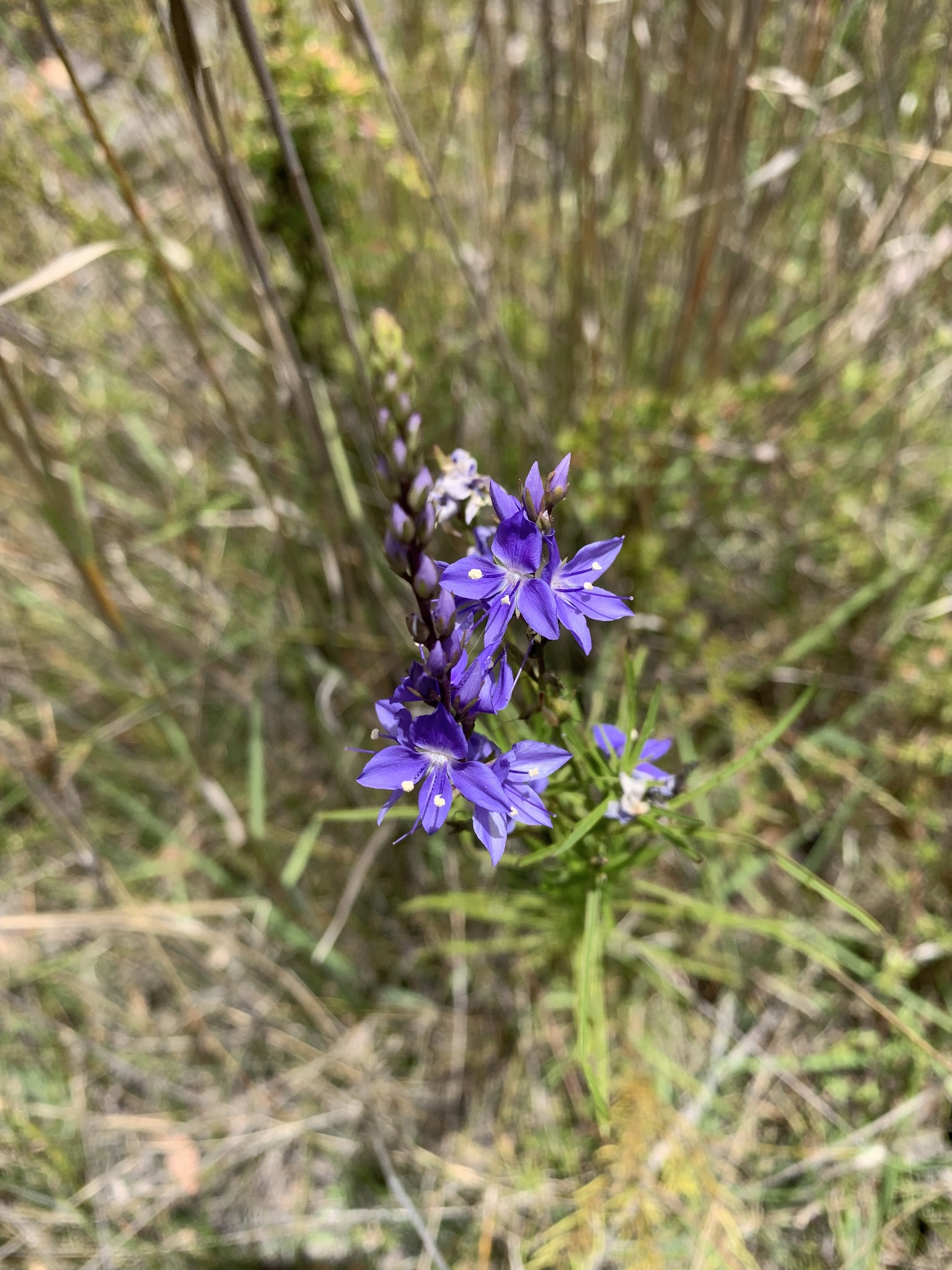

Scientific classification
- Kingdom: Plantae
- Clade: Embryophytes
- Clade: Tracheophytes
- Clade: Spermatophytes
- Clade: Angiosperms
- Clade: Eudicots
- Clade: Asterids
- Order: Lamiales
- Family: Plantaginaceae
- Genus: Veronica
- Species: V. arenaria

Binomial name
- Veronica arenaria A.Cunn. ex Benth.

= Veronica arenaria =

Species of flowering plant

Veronica arenaria is a flowering plant in the family Plantaginaceae. It is a small, clumping shrub with blue flowers. It grows in New South Wales and Queensland in Australia.

== Descritpiton ==
Veronica arenaria is a small, softly woody herb with upright stems 3–100 cm (1.2–39.4 in) high from the rootstock with short, stiff curved hairs. Leaves linear, sessile, margins entire or with occasional hairs or irregular lobes, pointed, 2–5.5 cm (0.79–2.17 in) long, 1–3 mm (0.039–0.118 in) wide, smooth and a few hairs on the margins. Violet blue flowers are borne in racemes 20–35 cm (7.9–13.8 in) long in clusters of 50-100, corolla 7–10 mm (0.28–0.39 in) long, calyx lobes 4–10 mm (0.16–0.39 in) long and 1–1.5 mm (0.039–0.059 in) wide. Flowering occurs from September to May and the fruit is a broad egg-shaped capsule, 3.5–6 mm (0.14–0.24 in) long, 2.5–3.5 mm (0.098–0.138 in) wide, notched, shiny and short hairs on upper margin.

== Taxonomy and naming ==
Veronica arenaria was first formally described in 1846 by George Bentham in Prodromus Systematis Naturalis Regni Vegetabilis from an unpublished description by Allan Cunningham. The specific epithet (arenaria) means "growing on sand".

== Distribution and habitat ==
This species of Veronica grows in southern Queensland and New South Wales in sandy and rocky soils, river flats and sometimes in woodland.
