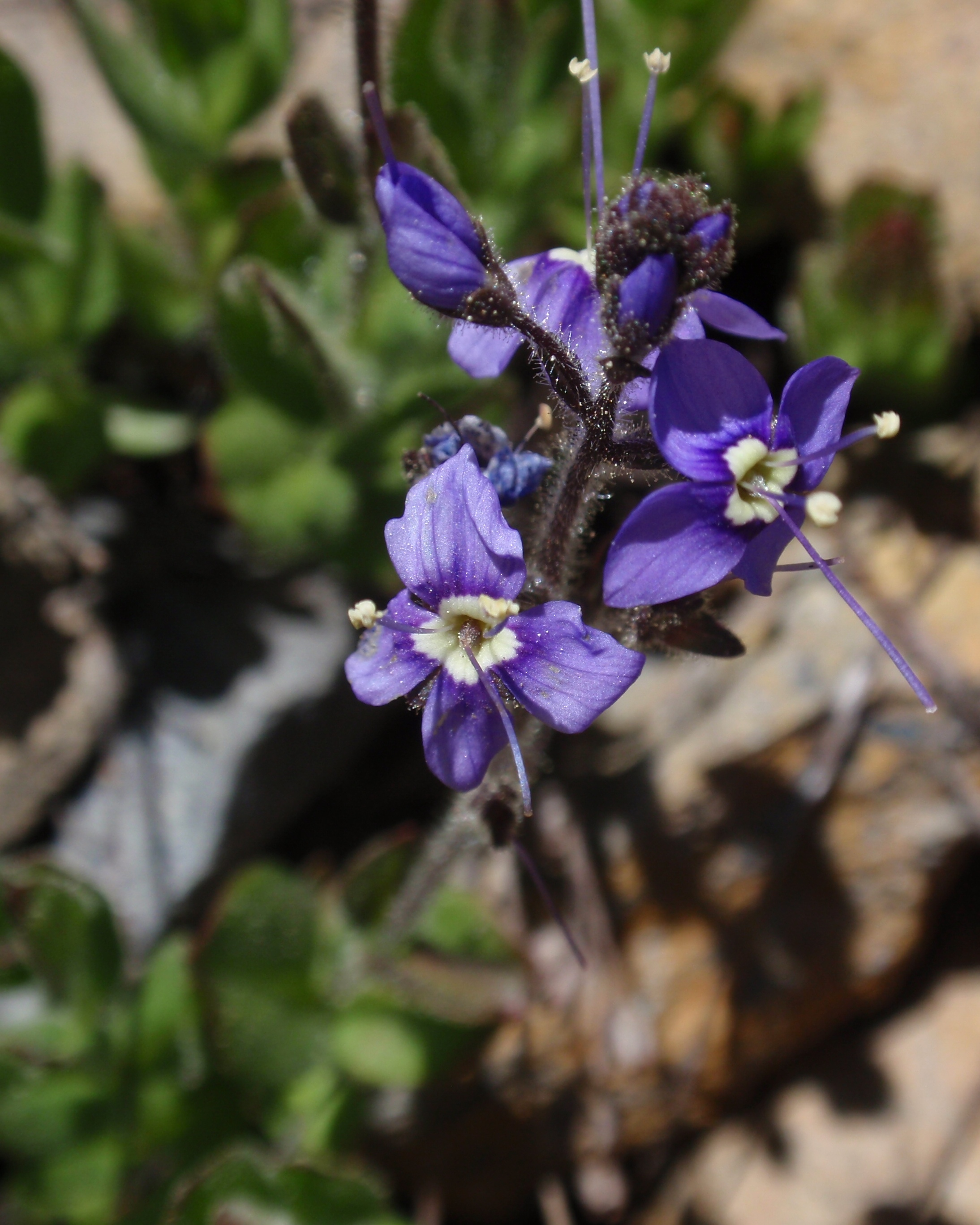

Conservation status
- Vulnerable (NatureServe)

Scientific classification
- Kingdom: Plantae
- Clade: Embryophytes
- Clade: Tracheophytes
- Clade: Spermatophytes
- Clade: Angiosperms
- Clade: Eudicots
- Clade: Asterids
- Order: Lamiales
- Family: Plantaginaceae
- Genus: Veronica
- Species: V. copelandii

Binomial name
- Veronica copelandii Eastw.

= Veronica copelandii =

Species of flowering plant

Veronica copelandii is a rare species of flowering plant in the plantain family known by the common name Copeland's speedwell.

It is endemic to California, where it is known only from the southeastern Klamath Mountains in Shasta and Trinity Counties. It occurs in mountain meadows and forest habitat in subalpine zones, usually on serpentine soils.

== Description ==
Veronica copelandii is a rhizomatous perennial herb with hairy, glandular stems growing up to about 12 centimeters (4.7 in) tall. The hairy oval leaves are up to 3.5 centimeters long and have smooth edges.

The inflorescence is a raceme of flowers each about a centimeter across with four deep blue or purple petals with white bases.
