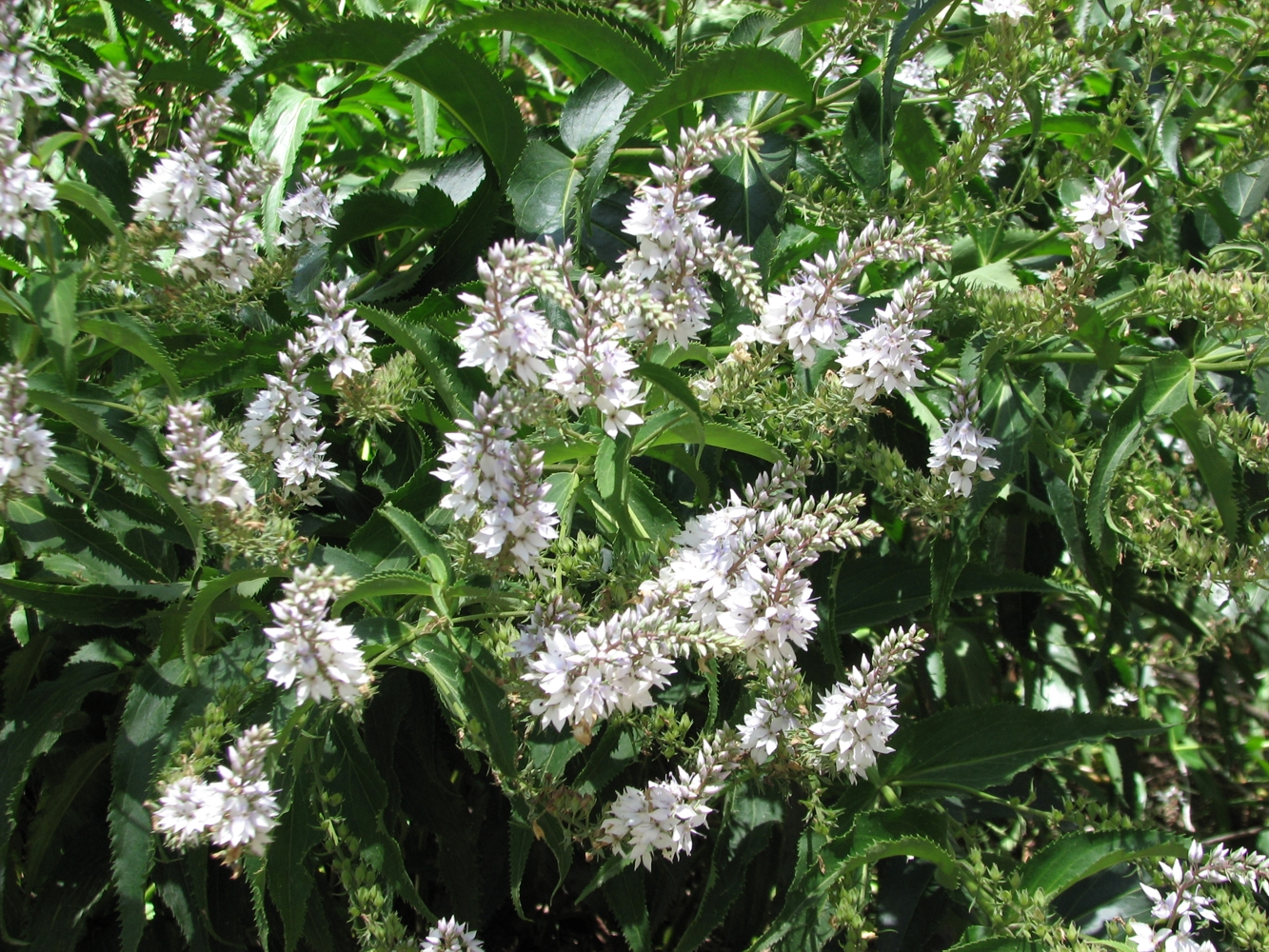

Scientific classification
- Kingdom: Plantae
- Clade: Embryophytes
- Clade: Tracheophytes
- Clade: Spermatophytes
- Clade: Angiosperms
- Clade: Eudicots
- Clade: Asterids
- Order: Lamiales
- Family: Plantaginaceae
- Genus: Veronica
- Species: V. derwentiana

Binomial name
- Veronica derwentiana Andrews

Synonyms
- Derwentia derwentiana (Andrews) B.G.Briggs & Ehrend.; Derwentia suaveolens Raf. nom. illeg.; Parahebe derwentiana (Andrews) B.G.Briggs & Ehrend.

= Veronica derwentiana =

Species of flowering plant

Veronica derwentiana, commonly known as Derwent speedwell, is a flowering plant species of the family Plantaginaceae, endemic to south-eastern Australia. It is a perennial with toothed leaves and white or pale blue flowers in terminal sprays in spring and summer.

== Description ==
Veronica derwentiana is a woody herb which grows to 140 cm (55 in) high with numerous upright stems from a woody rootstock. The stems are smooth or have small hairs lying longitudinal, occasionally on the whole surface and not branched below the flowers. The stems remain for up to 2 years. The leaves are 5–20 cm (2.0–7.9 in) long, lance to egg-shaped and ending in a sharp point or tapering to a point. The leaves vary at the base and may be wedge, squared, or heart shaped on a small broad stalk or without a stalk. The leaf margin has 30-80 small pointed teeth. The calyx lobes are 2–5 mm (0.079–0.197 in) long, either smooth or with occasional short hairs. The flower petals are 5–9 mm (0.20–0.35 in) long, white, pale lilac or pale blue in racemes of 40-100 flowers. The seed capsule is narrow or broadly egg-shaped, 2.8–5.5 mm (0.11–0.22 in) long, 2.5–4.5 mm (0.098–0.177 in) wide and either smooth or with short hairs on the upper side and somewhat lustrous. Flowering occurs in summer.

== Taxonomy and naming ==
Veronica derwentiana was first formally described by Henry Cranke Andrews in 1808 and the description was published in The Botanist's Repository for New and Rare Plants. The species was named after the type form where it was found near the Derwent River Tasmania.

There are five subspecies described and accepted by the Australian Plant Census:

- V. derwentiana Andrews subsp. derwentiana;
- V. derwentiana subsp. homalodonta (B.G.Briggs & Ehrend.) B.G.Briggs;
- V. derwentiana subsp. maideniana (Gand.) B.G.Briggs;
- V. derwentiana subsp. subglauca (B.G.Briggs & Ehrend.) B.G.Briggs;
- V. derwentiana subsp. anisodonta (B.G.Briggs & Ehrend.) B.G.Briggs.

== Distribution and habitat ==
Derwent speedwell occurs in a variety of habitats including eucalypt forest and alpine herb fields in Queensland, New South Wales, Victoria, Tasmania and South Australia. It is often seen on disturbed sites.
