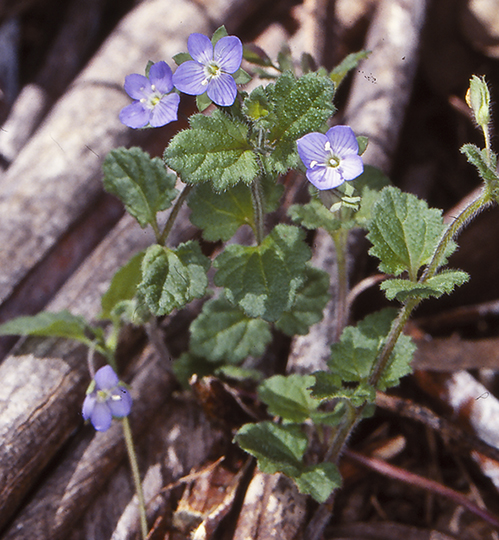
- Veronica calycina flowers and foliage

Scientific classification
- Kingdom: Plantae
- Clade: Embryophytes
- Clade: Tracheophytes
- Clade: Spermatophytes
- Clade: Angiosperms
- Clade: Eudicots
- Clade: Asterids
- Order: Lamiales
- Family: Plantaginaceae
- Genus: Veronica
- Species: V. calycina

Binomial name
- Veronica calycina R.Br.

Synonyms
- Veronica calycina var. gunnii (Benth.) Hook.f.; Veronica calycina var. longifolia Benth.; Veronica calycina var. parviflora Benth.; Veronica cycnorum Miq.; Veronica cygnorum Bartl.; Veronica gunnii Benth.

= Veronica calycina =

Species of flowering plant

Veronica calycina, commonly known as hairy speedwell or cup speedwell, is a flowering plant in the family Plantaginaceae. It is a trailing perennial with dark green leaves, purple-blue flowers and is endemic to Australia.

== Description ==
Veronica calycina grows is a trailing, perennial herb, with stolons reaching 50 cm (20 in) long and rooting at leaf nodes. The flowering stems are up to 5–45 cm (2–17.5 in) long with soft stem hairs to 2 mm (0.079 in) long. The leaves are arranged in opposite pairs, usually hairy, ovate to broadly ovate, 0.7–3 cm (0.28–1.18 in) long and 0.5–2 cm (0–1 in) wide, apex either rounded or broadly pointed, base squared or slightly heart-shaped, margins with uneven, blunt teeth and a petiole 2–20 mm (0.079–0.787 in) long. The small racemes of pale blue-purple flowers are mostly in groups of up to 10 flowers, occasionally solitary, with four wide petals about 6 mm (0.24 in) long, and corolla 4–6 mm (0.16–0.24 in) long. The calyx lobes have small hairs mostly on the margins, 6.5–8.5 mm (0.26–0.33 in) long and 2.5–5 mm (0.098–0.197 in) wide when fruiting. Flowering occurs in spring and summer.

== Taxonomy ==
Veronica calycina was first formally described in 1810 by Robert Brown and the description was published in Prodromus Florae Novae Hollandiae et Insulae Van Diemen. The specific epithet (calycina) means "belonging to the calyx".

== Distribution ==
Hairy speedwell is a widespread species, found in all states and territories apart from the Northern Territory. It grows in sheltered forest and shrubland on the coast, ranges and at higher altitudes in shady, moist locations.
