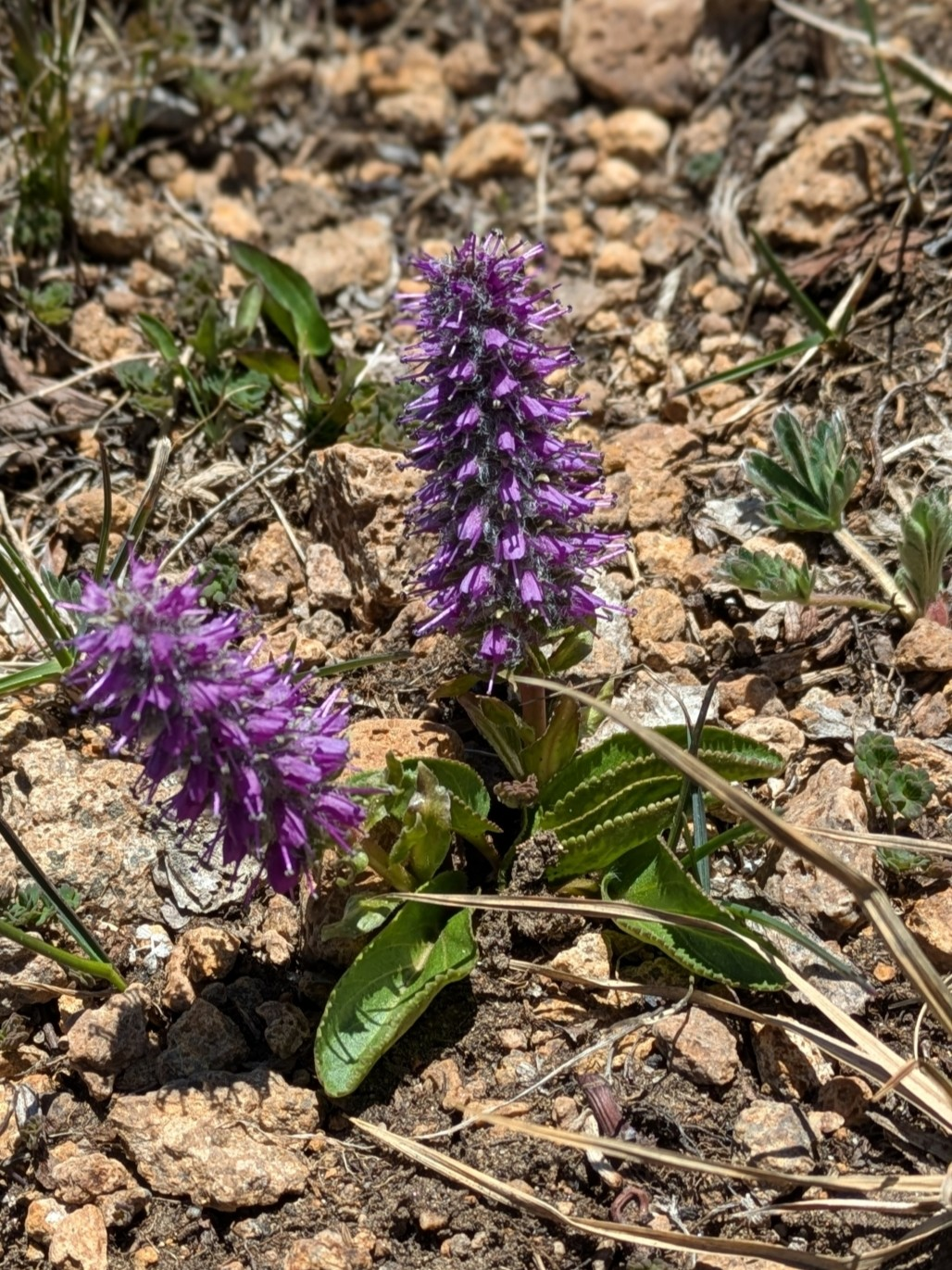
- South side of Pennsylvania Mountain, San Isabel National Forest

Conservation status
- Apparently Secure (NatureServe)

Scientific classification
- Kingdom: Plantae
- Clade: Embryophytes
- Clade: Tracheophytes
- Clade: Angiosperms
- Clade: Eudicots
- Clade: Asterids
- Order: Lamiales
- Family: Plantaginaceae
- Genus: Veronica
- Species: V. besseya

Binomial name
- Veronica besseya M.M.Mart.Ort. & Albach

Synonyms
- Besseya alpina (A.Gray) Rydb.; Synthyris alpina A.Gray; Wulfenia alpina (A.Gray) Greene

= Veronica besseya =

Plant species in the veronica family

Veronica besseya is a plant species in the veronica family that is also known by the scientific names Synthyris alpina and Besseya alpina as well as alpine kittentails.

== Description ==
Alpine kittentails are subscapose herbs, a plant with a flowering stem that is almost leafless, that are perennials. Its unbranched flowering stems grow 5 to 20 centimeters (2–8 in) tall. The basal leaves are 2.5 to 6 cm (1–2.5 in) long and 1 to 4 cm wide on leaf stalks 3 to 10 cm (1–4 in) long.

The blue, bluish purple, lavender, or reddish flowers usually have four petals, but might have three or five. More than 100 can be densely packed on the inflorescence.

== Taxonomy ==
In 1862 the botanist Asa Gray scientifically described a species which he named Synthyris alpina. The specimens described by Gray were collected in 1861 near the headwaters of South Clear Creek and east of Middle Park in Colorado by Charles Christopher Parry. The botanist Edward Lee Greene published a description of the species in 1894 where he moved it to the genus Wulfenia, but this did not become accepted. It was moved to a new genus named Besseya as Besseya alpina in 1903 by Per Axel Rydberg. However, in 2004 María Montserrat Martínez Ortega and Dirk C. Albach merged both Synthyris and Besseya into Veronica on the basis that the difference of having a rosette made them insufficiently different from other species in the larger genus, renaming it Veronica besseya.

Veronica besseya is listed as the accepted name in Plants of the World Online, but the name Synthyris alpina is used by World Plants, the Flora of North America, and NatureServe, while the Natural Resources Conservation Service uses Rydberg's Besseya alpina.

=== Names ===
Rydberg named the genus Besseya for his teacher at the University of Nebraska, Charles Edwin Bessey. When the species was moved to Veronica Martínez Ortega and Albach needed to choose a new name for the species, the name Veronica alpina having already been used for another species, and chose Veronica besseya as B. alpina was the type for the genus. It is known variously by the common names alpine kittentails, alpine kittentail, alpine coral-drops, alpine coraldrops, or alpine besseya.

== Range and habitat ==
Alpine kittentails are native to the Rocky Mountains of southern Wyoming, Colorado, and Northern New Mexico. Additionally, an isolated population grows in the LaSal Mountains in southeastern Utah. They range from as low as 2,800 meters (9,200 ft) to as high as 4,300 meters (14,100 ft). Its habitat is moist rocky meadows, boulder fields, and the scree as the base of cliffs.
