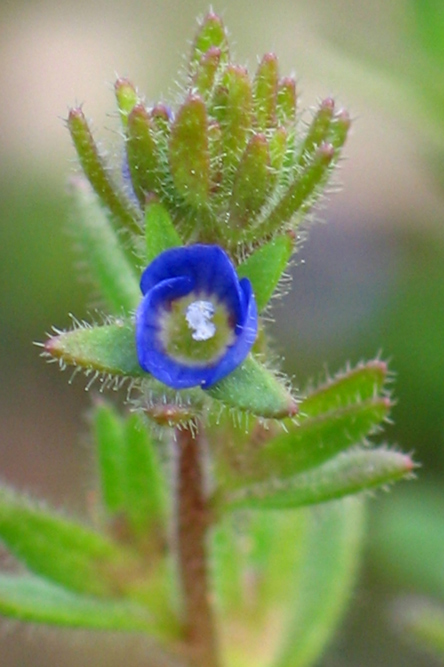
- Close-up of flower
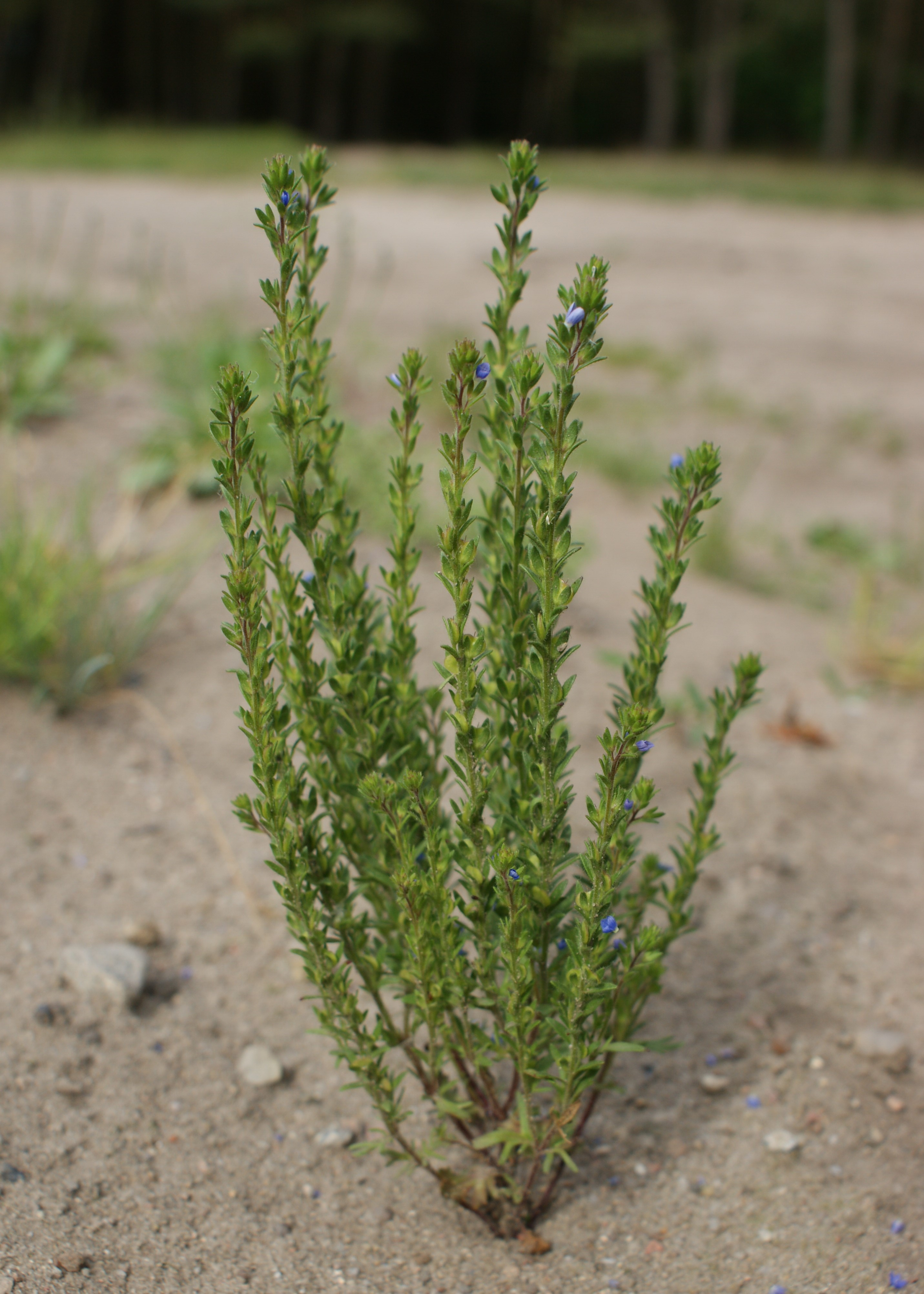
- In bloom, Poland

Scientific classification
- Kingdom: Plantae
- Clade: Tracheophytes
- Clade: Angiosperms
- Clade: Eudicots
- Clade: Asterids
- Order: Lamiales
- Family: Plantaginaceae
- Genus: Veronica
- Species: V. dillenii

Binomial name
- Veronica dillenii Crantz

= Veronica dillenii =

Species of flowering plant

Veronica dillenii, commonly known as Dillenius' speedwell, is a species of flowering plant in the speedwell genus Veronica, family Plantaginaceae. It is found in warmer parts of Europe, the Caucasus region, and on to Kazakhstan, and it has been introduced to the eastern United States; Wisconsin, Illinois, Indiana, Michigan, New York, and Virginia. Considered somewhat weedy, it does not persist in fields under intensive agriculture.
