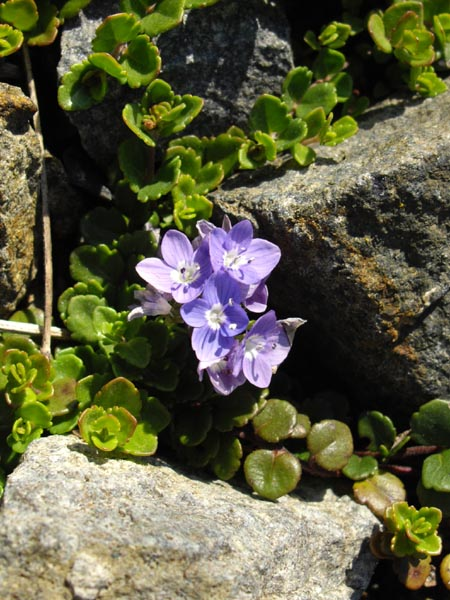
- Flowers and leaves are tiny.
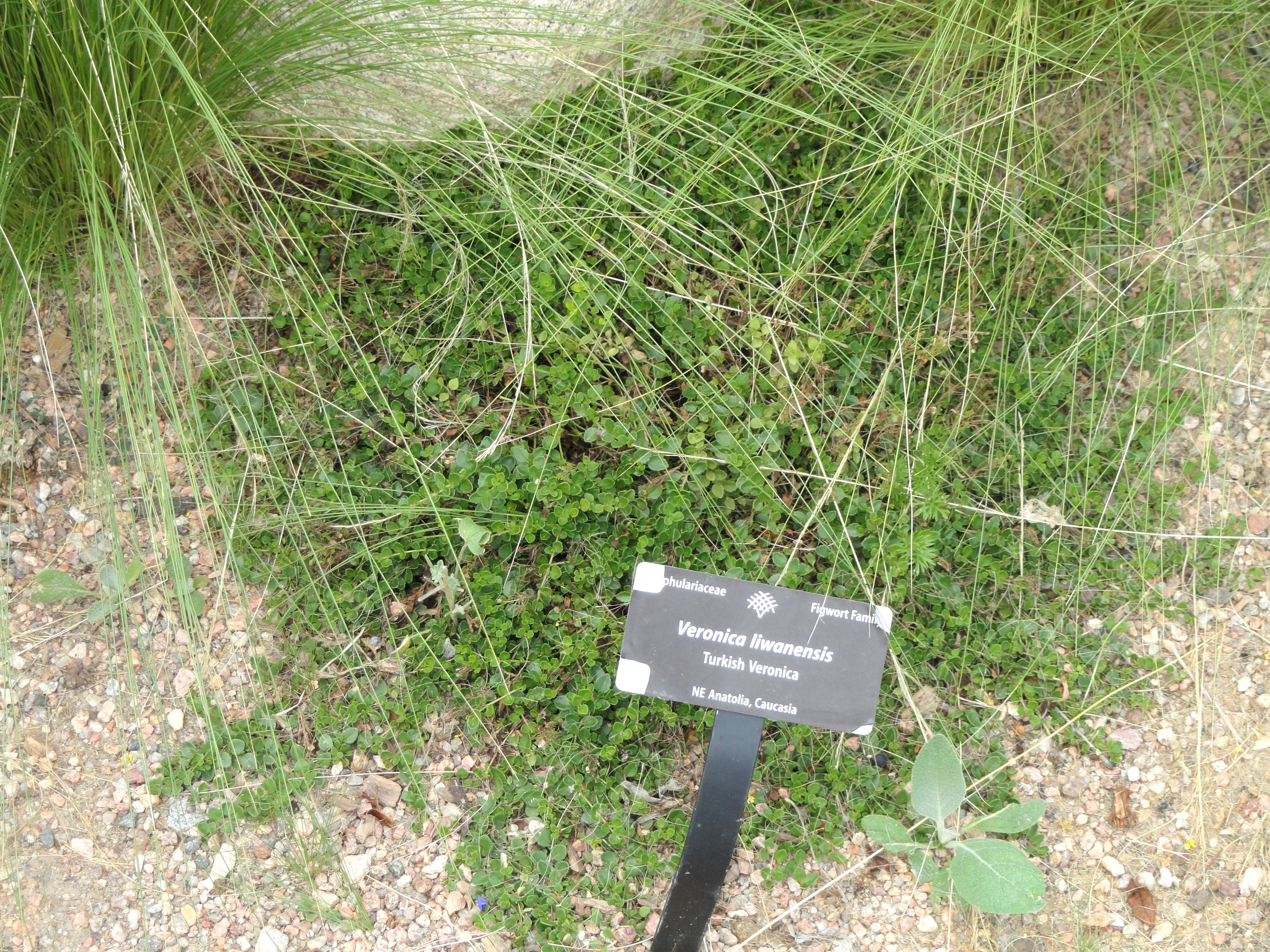
- At the Denver Botanic Gardens

Scientific classification
- Kingdom: Plantae
- Clade: Embryophytes
- Clade: Tracheophytes
- Clade: Spermatophytes
- Clade: Angiosperms
- Clade: Eudicots
- Clade: Asterids
- Order: Lamiales
- Family: Plantaginaceae
- Genus: Veronica
- Species: V. liwanensis

Binomial name
- Veronica liwanensis K.Koch

Synonyms
- Veronica orbicularisz Fisch. ex Trautv.; Veronica telephiifolia var. pilosula Boiss.

= Veronica liwanensis =

Species of flowering plant

Veronica liwanensis, the Turkish speedwell, is a species of flowering plant in the family Plantaginaceae. It is native to northeast Turkey and the Caucasus. A tough, mat‑forming perennial, adapted to drought and shade, and hardy to USDA zone 4, it is useful in rock gardens, particularly between stepping stones.
