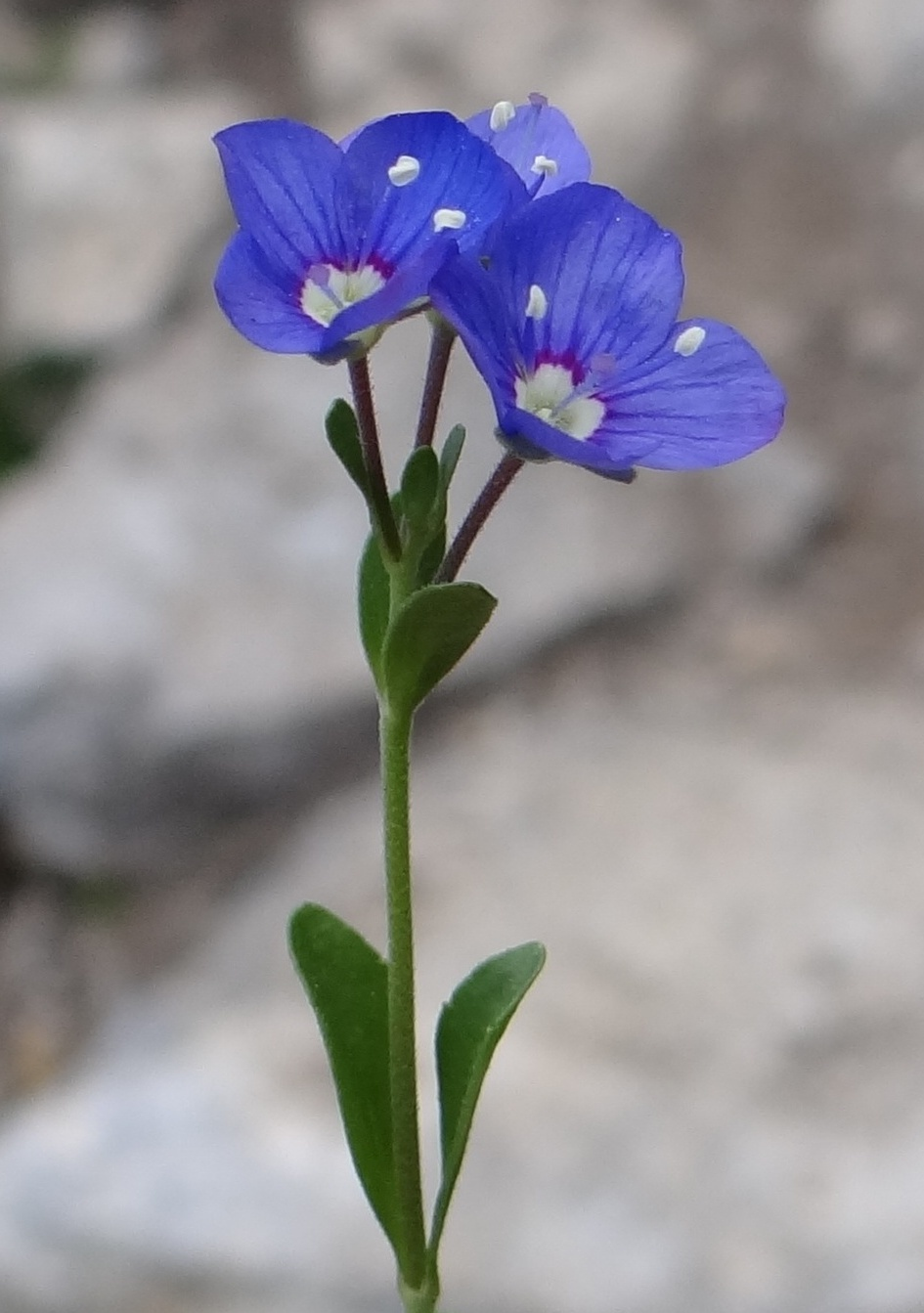
- Flowers

Scientific classification
- Kingdom: Plantae
- Clade: Embryophytes
- Clade: Tracheophytes
- Clade: Spermatophytes
- Clade: Angiosperms
- Clade: Eudicots
- Clade: Asterids
- Order: Lamiales
- Family: Plantaginaceae
- Genus: Veronica
- Species: V. fruticans

Binomial name
- Veronica fruticans Jacq.

Synonyms
- Veronica saxatilis (Note: common name blue rock speedwell) Scop.

= Veronica fruticans =

Species of flowering plant

Veronica fruticans, the rock speedwell (a name it shares with other members of its genus) or woodystem speedwell (a common name that is hardly in common use), is a species of flowering plant in the family Plantaginaceae. It is native to nearly all countries in Europe, including the Faroe Islands and Iceland, and Greenland (which is floristically part of North America). It grows either in mountains in the south, or at lower elevations in colder areas in the north of its range. It is the official flower of Bardu Municipality in Troms county, Norway. It has been occasionally cultivated in rock and alpine gardens as a ground cover.
