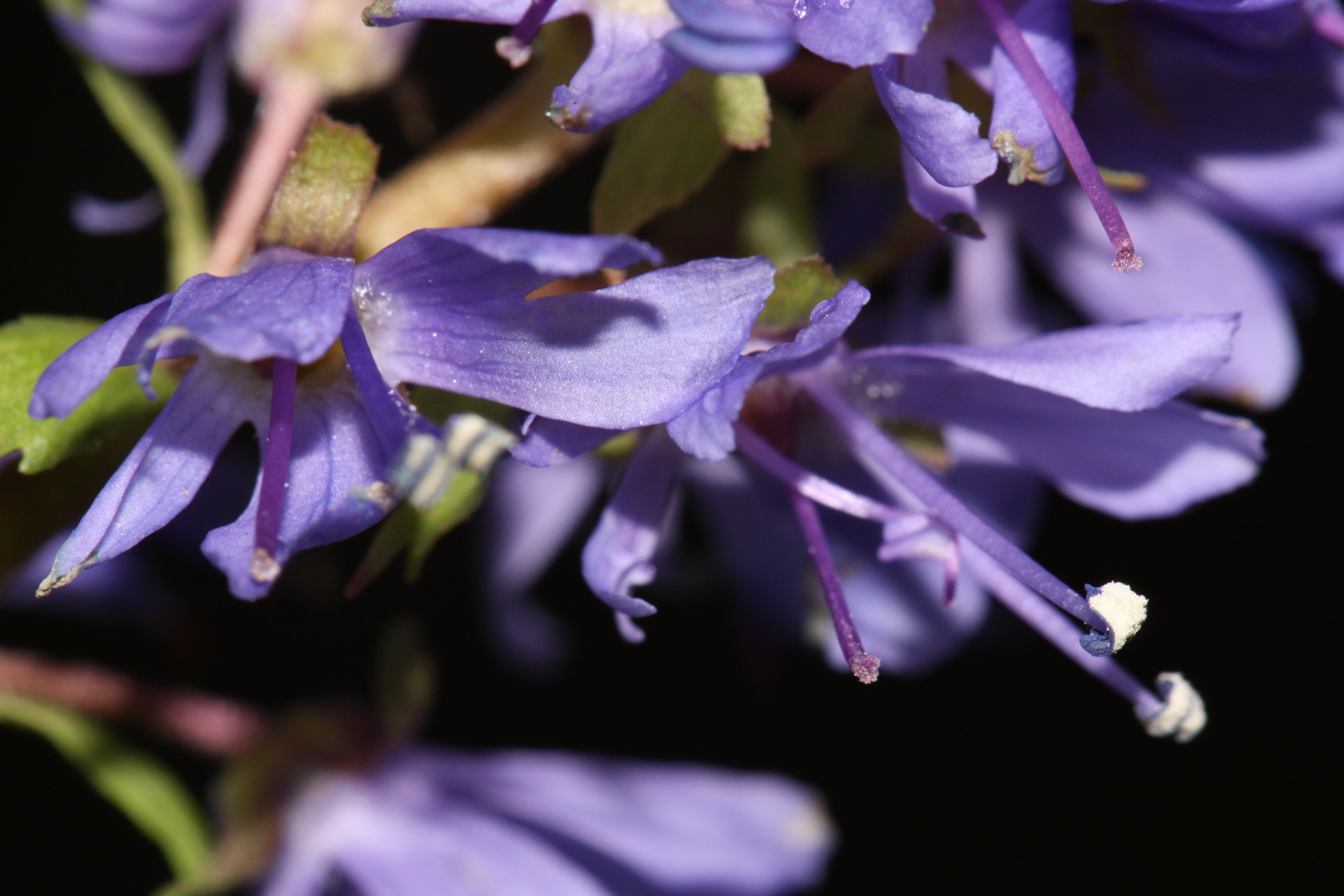

Scientific classification
- Kingdom: Plantae
- Clade: Embryophytes
- Clade: Tracheophytes
- Clade: Spermatophytes
- Clade: Angiosperms
- Clade: Eudicots
- Clade: Asterids
- Order: Lamiales
- Family: Plantaginaceae
- Genus: Veronica
- Species: V. missurica

Binomial name
- Veronica missurica Raf.

Synonyms
- Synthyris missurica (Raf.) Pennell

= Veronica missurica =

Species of flowering plant

Veronica missurica (syn. Synthyris missurica) is a species of flowering plant in the family Plantaginaceae known by the common names tailed kittentails, mountain kittentails, or Columbia kittentails. It is native to the Pacific Northwest of the United States, where it grows in moist areas in forests and other mountain and foothill habitat types. It is often one of the first wildflowers to bloom in its mountain habitat, sometimes coming up before the snow is melted. It is a rhizomatous perennial herb with a rosette of basal leaves with toothed, rounded blades borne on petioles. The inflorescence is a raceme of bright violet-blue flowers, each about half a centimeter long with two protruding stamens.
