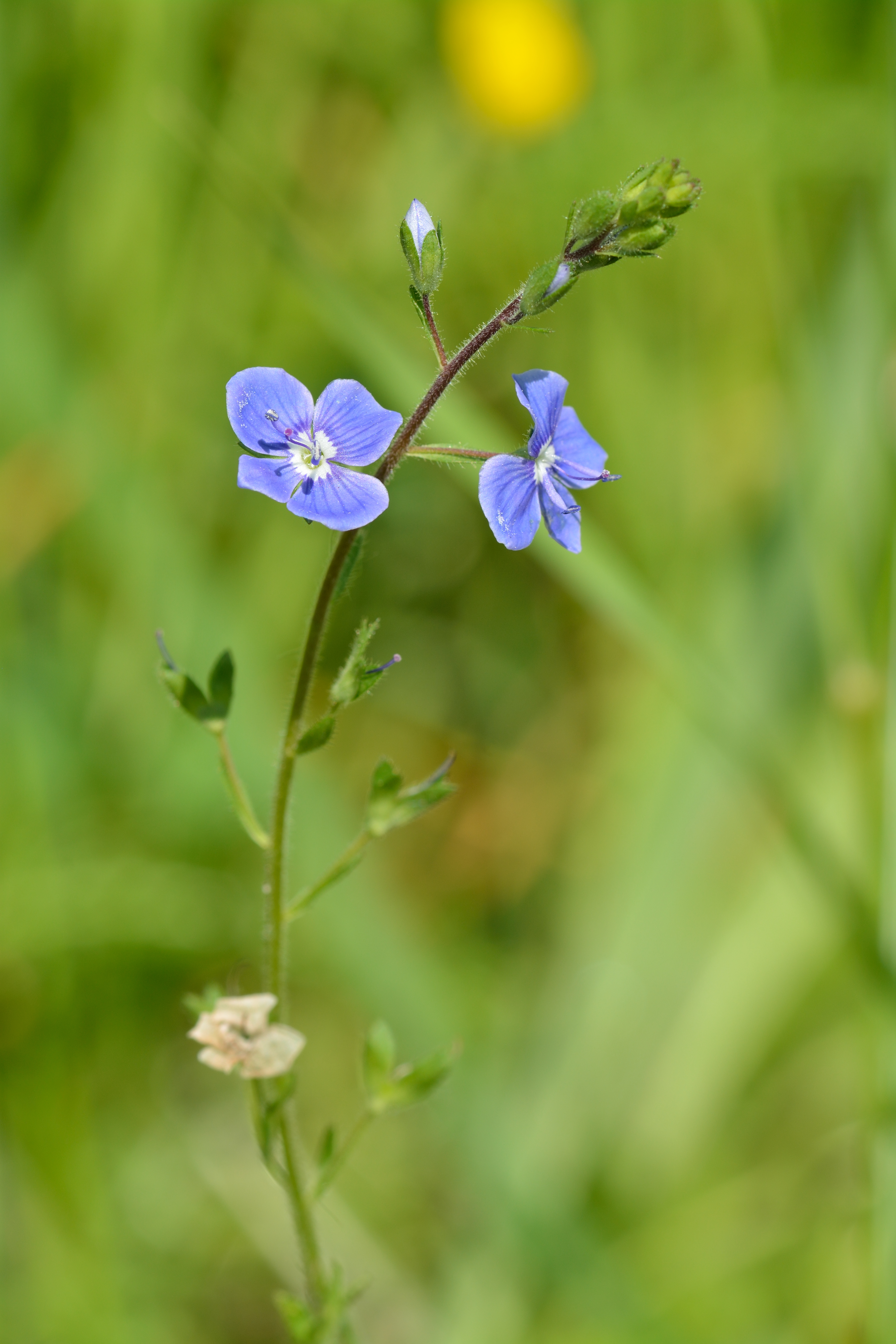
- Veronica chamaedrys

Scientific classification
- Kingdom: Plantae
- Clade: Tracheophytes
- Clade: Angiosperms
- Clade: Eudicots
- Clade: Asterids
- Order: Lamiales
- Family: Plantaginaceae
- Tribe: Veroniceae
- Genus: Veronica; L.

Type species
- Veronica officinalis L.

Synonyms
- List: Agerella Fourr.; Aidelus Spreng.; Allopleia Raf.; Atelianthus Nutt. ex Benth.; Azurinia Fourr.; Beccabunga Hill; Besseya Rydb.; Bonarota Adans.; Cardia Dulac; Chionohebe B.G.Briggs & Ehrend.; Cochlidiosperma (Rchb.) Rchb.; Coerulinia Fourr.; Cymbophyllum F.Muell.; Derwentia Raf.; Detzneria Schltr. ex Diels; Diplophyllum Lehm.; Eustachya Raf.; Eustaxia Raf.; Hebe Comm. ex Juss.; Hebejeebie Heads; Hedystachys Fourr.; Heliohebe Garn.-Jones; Leonohebe Heads; Limnaspidium Fourr.; Lunellia Nieuwl.; Odicardis Raf.; Oligospermum D.Y.Hong; Omphalospora Bartl.; Paederotella (E.Wulff) Kem.-Nath.; Panoxis Raf.; Parahebe W.R.B.Oliv.; Petrodora Fourr.; Pocilla Fourr.; Ponaria Raf.; Pseudolysimachion Opiz; Pygmea Hook.f.; Synthyris Benth.; Uranostachys Fourr.; Veronicella Fourr.; Zeliauros Raf.

= Veronica (plant) =

Genus of flowering plants

Veronica is the largest genus in the flowering plant family Plantaginaceae, with about 500 species. It was formerly classified in the family Scrophulariaceae. Common names include speedwell, bird's eye, and gypsyweed.

Taxonomy for this genus was changed in the early 21st century, with the genus Hebe and the related Australasian genera Derwentia, Detzneria, Chionohebe, Heliohebe, Leonohebe and Parahebe now included. Monophyly of the genus is supported by nuclear ribosomal internal transcribed spacer (ITS) and cpDNA.

The taxa of the genus are herbaceous annuals or perennials, and also subshrubs, shrubs or small trees when Hebe is included. Most of the species are from the temperate Northern Hemisphere, though with some species from the Southern Hemisphere; Veronica sect. Hebe is mostly from New Zealand.

== Taxonomy ==
The genus name Veronica used in binomial nomenclature was chosen by Carl Linnaeus based on preexisting common usage of the name veronica in many European languages for plants in this group. Such use in English is attested as early as 1572. The name probably reflects a connection with Saint Veronica, whose Latin name is ultimately derived from Greek, Berenice.

=== Hebe complex ===
In 1769, Joseph Banks and Daniel Solander collected plants in the Southern Hemisphere that were later published in the genus Veronica, such as Veronica pubescens and Veronica stricta. Although the genus Hebe was established in 1789, few botanists initially accepted it, continuing to use Veronica. From the 1920s onwards, New Zealand botanists in particular began to use other genera; for example, V. pubescens was transferred to Hebe by Leonard Cockayne and Harry Allan in 1927, and V. stricta to Hebe by Lucy Moore in 1961. By the beginning of the 21st century, a range of genera were used for the "Hebe complex" consisting of Southern Hemisphere species related to Veronica, including Chionohebe, Derwentia, Detzneria, Hebe, Heliohebe, Leonohebe and Parahebe. However, molecular phylogenetic studies from the early 21st century onwards showed that segregating Southern Hemisphere genera in this way rendered Veronica paraphyletic, since the segregated genera were all embedded within Veronica. To create monophyletic genera, either the Northern Hemisphere Veronica species would have to be divided among a substantial number of smaller genera, or Veronica would have to be expanded to include the Hebe complex. The latter approach was chosen by Garnock-Jones et al. in 2007, and has been followed since in taxonomic databases such as Plants of the World Online and the Flora of New Zealand Online.

=== Selected species ===
As of October 2022, Plants of the World Online listed about 460 accepted species and hybrids in the genus Veronica. This includes species formerly placed in the genus Hebe.

- Veronica agrestis, green field-speedwell
- Veronica alaskensis, Alaska speedwell
- Veronica alpina, alpine speedwell
- Veronica americana, American brooklime
- Veronica anagallis-aquatica, water speedwell
- Veronica aphylla, leafless stemmed speedwell
- Veronica arcuata
- Veronica arenaria
- Veronica arvensis, wall speedwell
- Veronica austriaca, Austrian speedwell
- Veronica beccabunga, brooklime
- Veronica bellidioides
- Veronica besseya
- Veronica bishopiana
- Veronica bullii
- Veronica calycina, cup speedwell
- Veronica catarractae
- Veronica catenata, pink water speedwell
- Veronica chamaedrys, germander speedwell
- Veronica cinerea
- Veronica continua B.G.Briggs
- Veronica copelandii, Copeland's speedwell
- Veronica cusickii, Cusick's speedwell
- Veronica cymbalaria, pale speedwell
- Veronica dabneyi, Azores speedwell
- Veronica derwentiana, Derwent speedwell
- Veronica dillenii, Dillenius' speedwell
- Veronica diosmifolia
- Veronica filiformis, slender speedwell
- Veronica formosa
- Veronica fruticans, rock speedwell
- Veronica gentianoides, gentian speedwell
- Veronica gracilis
- Veronica hederifolia, ivy-leaved speedwell
- Veronica incana, silver speedwell
- Veronica japonensis
- Veronica jovellanoides
- Veronica liwanensis
- Veronica longifolia, long-leaved speedwell
- Veronica lyallii
- Veronica mannii
- Veronica missurica
- Veronica montana, wood speedwell
- Veronica nivea
- Veronica obtusata
- Veronica officinalis, heath speedwell
- Veronica ovata
- Veronica panormitana
- Veronica peduncularis
- Veronica peregrina, American speedwell
- Veronica perfoliata, Digger's speedwell
- Veronica persica, common field-speedwell
- Veronica pimeleoides
- Veronica pinguifolia
- Veronica plebeia, creeping speedwell
- Veronica polita, grey field speedwell
- Veronica ponae
- Veronica prostrata, sprawling speedwell
- Veronica pubescens
- Veronica pulvinaris
- Veronica rakaiensis
- Veronica regina-nivalis
- Veronica repens, Corsican speedwell
- Veronica salicifolia
- Veronica scutellata, marsh speedwell
- Veronica serpyllifolia, thyme-leaved speedwell
- Veronica speciosa
- Veronica spicata, spiked speedwell
- Veronica stricta
- Veronica strictissima
- Veronica syriaca
- Veronica topiaria
- Veronica traversii
- Veronica triphyllos, fingered speedwell
- Veronica turrilliana
- Veronica verna, spring speedwell
- Veronica vernicosa
- Veronica wormskjoldii, Wormskjold's speedwell

== Uses ==
=== Food and medicine ===
Veronica americana is edible and nutritious, as are most species in the genus Veronica, and is reported to have a flavor similar to watercress. Native Americans used Veronica species as an expectorant tea to alleviate bronchial congestion associated with asthma and allergies. The plant can be confused with skullcap and other members of the mint family. Members of the mint family have square sided stems, and Veronica species have rounded stems.

Veronica sp. herb has been used in the traditional Austrian medicine internally (as tea) for treatment of disorders of the nervous system, respiratory tract, cardiovascular system, and metabolism.

=== Ground cover ===
Several Veronica species and cultivars are cultivated for use as ground cover.

== As weeds ==
Several species of speedwell are sometimes considered weeds in lawns. Some of the more common of these are Persian speedwell (V. persica), creeping speedwell (V. filiformis), corn speedwell (V. arvensis), germander speedwell (V. chamaedrys), and ivy-leaved speedwell (V. hederifolia). It is often difficult to tell one species from another. There are five to seven species of speedwell in Michigan alone that are easily confused.

== Ecology ==
Species of Veronica are used as food plants by the larvae of some species of Lepidoptera, including the grizzled skipper.

An annual life history is known to have evolved separately several times within the genus, with up to 10% of the genus now having an annual life cycle. An annual life cycle, and associated morphological traits, is an adaptation thought to have developed in response to an extremely arid or generally unpredictable environment, and may persist in Veronica due to a historic concentration and radiation of members of the genus in and from the climatically volatile Balkan Peninsula.
