= List of Veronica species =

List of the species of the plant genus Veronica

As of October 2022, Plants of the World Online listed about 460 accepted species and hybrids in the genus Veronica. Additionally, the Australian Plant Census accepts Veronica brownii.

== A ==
- Veronica abyssinica Fresen.
- Veronica acinifolia L.
- Veronica acrotheca Bornm. & Gauba
- Veronica adamsii Cheeseman
- Veronica × affinis (Cheeseman) Garn.-Jones
- Veronica agrestis L.
- Veronica alaskensis M.M.Mart.Ort. & Albach
- Veronica alatavica Popov
- Veronica albicans Petrie
- Veronica albiflora (Pennell) Albach
- Veronica allahuekberensis Öztürk
- Veronica allionii Vill.
- Veronica alpina L.
- Veronica × altaica Kosachev
- Veronica americana (Raf.) Schwein. ex Benth.
- Veronica amoena M.Bieb.
- Veronica amplexicaulis J.B.Armstr.
- Veronica anagallis-aquatica L.
- Veronica anagalloides Guss.
- Veronica × andersonii Lindl. & Paxton
- Veronica angustifolia (Vahl) Bernh.
- Veronica angustissima (Cockayne) Garn.-Jones
- Veronica annulata Cockayne ex Cheeseman
- Veronica antalyensis M.A.Fisch., Erik & Sümbül
- Veronica aphylla L.
- Veronica aragonensis Stroh
- Veronica archboldii Pennell
- Veronica arcuata (B.G.Briggs & Ehrend.) B.G.Briggs
- Veronica arenaria A.Cunn. ex Benth.
- Veronica arenosa (Serg.) Boriss.
- Veronica arganthera (Garn.-Jones, Bayly, W.G.Lee & Rance) Garn.-Jones
- Veronica argute-serrata Regel & Schmalh.
- Veronica armena Boiss. & A.Huet
- Veronica armstrongii Johnson ex J.B.Armstr.
- Veronica arvensis L.
- Veronica aucheri Boiss.
- Veronica austriaca L.
- Veronica avromanica M.A.Fisch.
- Veronica aznavourii Dörfl.

== B ==
- Veronica bachofenii Heuff.
- Veronica balansae Stroh
- Veronica baranetzkii Bordz.
- Veronica barkeri Cockayne
- Veronica barrelieri H.Schott ex Roem. & Schult.
- Veronica baumgartenii Roem. & Schult.
- Veronica baylyi Garn.-Jones
- Veronica beccabunga L.
- Veronica bellidioides L.
- Veronica benthamii Hook.f.
- Veronica besseya M.M.Mart.Ort. & Albach
- Veronica × bidwillii Hook.
- Veronica biggarii Cockayne
- Veronica biloba Schreb. ex L.
- Veronica birleyi N.E.Br.
- Veronica bishopiana Petrie
- Veronica blakelyi (B.G.Briggs & Ehrend.) B.G.Briggs
- Veronica × blockiana (Trávn.) Albach
- Veronica bogosensis Tumadz.
- Veronica bollonsii Cockayne
- Veronica bombycina Boiss. & Kotschy
- Veronica borisovae Holub
- Veronica bozakmanii M.A.Fisch.
- Veronica brachysiphon (Summerh.) Bean
- Veronica brassii (Pennell) Albach
- Veronica breviracemosa W.R.B.Oliv.
- Veronica buchananii Hook.f.
- Veronica bucharica B.Fedtsch.
- Veronica bullii (Eaton) M.M.Mart.Ort. & Albach
- Veronica bungei Boiss.

== C ==
- Veronica cachemirica Gand.
- Veronica caespitosa Boiss.
- Veronica calcicola (Bayly & Garn.-Jones) Garn.-Jones
- Veronica californica M.M.Mart.Ort. & Albach
- Veronica callitrichoides Kom.
- Veronica calycina R.Br.
- Veronica campylopoda Boiss.
- Veronica cana Wall. ex Benth.
- Veronica canbyi (Pennell) M.M.Mart.Ort. & Albach
- Veronica canterburiensis J.B.Armstr.
- Veronica capillipes Nevski
- Veronica capitata Royle ex Benth.
- Veronica capsellicarpa Dubovik
- Veronica cardiocarpa (Kar. & Kir.) Walp.
- Veronica carminea Albach
- Veronica carsei Petrie
- Veronica carstensensis Wernham
- Veronica × cassinioides Matthews ex Petrie
- Veronica catarractae G.Forst.
- Veronica catenata Pennell
- Veronica caucasica M.Bieb.
- Veronica ceratocarpa C.A.Mey.
- Veronica cetikiana Öztürk
- Veronica chamaedrys L.
- Veronica chamaepithyoides Lam.
- Veronica chathamica Buchanan
- Veronica chayuensis D.Y.Hong
- Veronica cheesemanii Benth.
- Veronica chinoalpina T.Yamaz.
- Veronica chionantha Bornm.
- Veronica chionohebe Garn.-Jones
- Veronica ciliata Fisch.
- Veronica ciliolata (Hook.f.) Cheeseman
- Veronica cinerea Boiss. & Balansa
- Veronica cockayneana Cheeseman
- Veronica colensoi Hook.f.
- Veronica colostylis Garn.-Jones
- Veronica consolatae Chiov.
- Veronica continua B.G.Briggs
- Veronica copelandii Eastw.
- Veronica corriganii (Carse) Garn.-Jones
- Veronica cretacea Ostapko
- Veronica crinita Kit. ex Schult.
- Veronica crista-galli Steven
- Veronica cryptomorpha (Bayly, Kellow, G.E.Harper & Garn.-Jones) Garn.-Jones
- Veronica cuneifolia D.Don
- Veronica cupressoides Hook.f.
- Veronica cusickii A.Gray
- Veronica cymbalaria Bodard
- Veronica × czemalensis Kosachev & Albach
- Veronica czerniakowskiana Monjuschko

== D ==
- Veronica dabneyi Hochst. ex Seub.
- Veronica daghestanica Trautv.
- Veronica dalmatica Padilla-García, Rojas-Andrés, López-González & M.M.Mart.Ort.
- Veronica daranica Saeidi & Ghahr.
- Veronica daurica Steven
- Veronica davisii M.A.Fisch.
- Veronica debilis Freyn
- Veronica decora (Ashwin) Garn.-Jones
- Veronica decorosa F.Muell.
- Veronica decumbens J.B.Armstr.
- Veronica deltigera Wall. ex Benth.
- Veronica densiflora Ledeb.
- Veronica densifolia (F.Muell.) F.Muell.
- Veronica denudata Albov
- Veronica derwentiana Andrews
- Veronica dichrus Schott & Kotschy
- Veronica dieffenbachii Benth.
- Veronica dilatata (G.Simpson & J.S.Thomson) Garn.-Jones
- Veronica dillenii Crantz
- Veronica diosmifolia A.Cunn.
- Veronica diosmoides Schltr.
- Veronica dissecta (Rydb.) M.M.Mart.Ort. & Albach
- Veronica distans R.Br.
- Veronica × divergens Cheeseman
- Veronica donetzica Ostapko
- Veronica donii Römpp

== E–F ==
- Veronica elliptica G.Forst.
- Veronica elmaliensis M.A.Fisch.
- Veronica emodi T.Yamaz.
- Veronica epacridea Hook.f.
- Veronica × erecta Kirk
- Veronica erinoides Boiss. & Spruner
- Veronica eriogyne H.J.P.Winkl.
- Veronica ersin-yucelii Yaylacı, O.Koyuncu & Ocak
- Veronica euphrasiifolia Link
- Veronica evenosa Petrie
- Veronica × fairfieldii Hook.f.
- Veronica fargesii Franch.
- Veronica farinosa Hausskn.
- Veronica fedtschenkoi Boriss.
- Veronica ferganica Popov
- Veronica filifolia Lipsky
- Veronica filiformis Sm.
- Veronica filipes P.C.Tsoong
- Veronica flavida (Bayly, Kellow & de Lange) Garn.-Jones
- Veronica formosa R.Br.
- Veronica forrestii Diels
- Veronica fragilis Boiss. & Hausskn.
- Veronica × franciscana Eastw.
- Veronica francispetae M.A.Fisch.
- Veronica fraterna N.E.Br.
- Veronica fridericae M.A.Fisch.
- Veronica fruticans Jacq.
- Veronica fruticulosa L.
- Veronica fuhsii Freyn & Sint.

== G–H ==
- Veronica galathica Boiss.
- Veronica gandhii Kottaim.
- Veronica gaubae Bornm.
- Veronica gentianoides Vahl
- Veronica gibbsii Kirk
- Veronica glandulosa Hochst. ex Benth.
- Veronica glauca Sm.
- Veronica glaucophylla Cockayne
- Veronica × godronii Rouy
- Veronica gorbunovii Gontsch.
- Veronica gracilis R.Br.
- Veronica grandiflora Gaertn.
- Veronica × grisea Kosachev & A.L.Ebel
- Veronica grisebachii Walters
- Veronica grosseserrata B.G.Briggs & Ehrend.
- Veronica gunae Schweinf. ex Engl.
- Veronica haastii Hook.f.
- Veronica hectorii Hook.f.
- Veronica hederifolia L.
- Veronica henryi T.Yamaz.
- Veronica heureka (M.A.Fisch.) Tzvelev
- Veronica hillebrandii F.Muell.
- Veronica himalensis D.Don
- Veronica hispidula Boiss. & A.Huet
- Veronica hookeri (Buchanan) Garn.-Jones
- Veronica hookeriana Walp.
- Veronica hulkeana F.Muell. ex Hook.f.

== I–K ==
- Veronica idahoensis M.M.Mart.Ort. & Albach
- Veronica incana L.
- Veronica inflexa Albach
- Veronica insularis Cheeseman
- Veronica intercedens Bornm.
- Veronica ionantha Albach
- Veronica japonensis Makino
- Veronica javanica Blume
- Veronica jovellanoides Garn.-Jones & de Lange
- Veronica kaiseri Täckh.
- Veronica kellowiae Garn.-Jones
- Veronica khorassanica Czerniak.
- Veronica kindlii Adamović
- Veronica × kirkii J.B.Armstr.
- Veronica × kolyvanensis Kosachev & Shmakov
- Veronica kopetdaghensis B.Fedtsch. ex Boriss.
- Veronica kopgecidiensis Öztürk & M.A.Fisch.
- Veronica kotschyana Benth.
- Veronica krasnoborovii Kosachev & Shaulo
- Veronica krylovii Schischk.
- Veronica kurdica Benth.

== L ==
- Veronica × lackschewitzii J.Keller
- Veronica laeta Kar. & Kir.
- Veronica × laevastonii (Cockayne & Allan) Garn.-Jones
- Veronica lanceolata Benth.
- Veronica lanosa Royle ex Benth.
- Veronica lanuginosa Benth. ex Hook.f.
- Veronica lavaudiana Raoul
- Veronica laxa Benth.
- Veronica laxissima D.Y.Hong
- Veronica leiocarpa Boiss.
- Veronica leiophylla Cheeseman
- Veronica × leiosala (Cockayne & Allan) Garn.-Jones
- Veronica lendenfeldii F.Muell.
- Veronica × lewisii J.B.Armstr.
- Veronica ligustrifolia A.Cunn.
- Veronica lilliputiana Stearn
- Veronica linariifolia Pall. ex Link
- Veronica linearis (Bornm.) Rojas-Andrés & M.M.Mart.Ort.
- Veronica linifolia Hook.f.
- Veronica lithophila (B.G.Briggs & Ehrend.) B.G.Briggs
- Veronica liwanensis K.Koch
- Veronica × loganioides J.B.Armstr.
- Veronica longifolia L.
- Veronica longipedicellata Saeidi
- Veronica longipetiolata D.Y.Hong
- Veronica luetkeana Rupr.
- Veronica lyallii Hook.f.
- Veronica lycica E.Lehm.
- Veronica lycopodioides Hook.f.

== M–N ==
- Veronica maccaskillii (Allan) Heenan
- Veronica macrantha Hook.f.
- Veronica macrocalyx J.B.Armstr.
- Veronica macrocarpa Vahl
- Veronica macropoda Boiss.
- Veronica macrostachya Vahl
- Veronica macrostemon Bunge
- Veronica magna M.A.Fisch.
- Veronica × major (Benth.) Wettst.
- Veronica mampodrensis Losa & P.Monts.
- Veronica mannii Hook.f.
- Veronica masoniae (L.B.Moore) Garn.-Jones
- Veronica matthewsii Cheeseman
- Veronica × mauksii Hulják
- Veronica mazanderanae Wendelbo
- Veronica × media Schrad.
- Veronica melanocaulon Garn.-Jones
- Veronica mexicana S.Watson
- Veronica michauxii Lam.
- Veronica micrantha Hoffmanns. & Link
- Veronica microcarpa Boiss.
- Veronica miqueliana Nakai
- Veronica mirabilis Wendelbo
- Veronica missurica Raf.
- Veronica monantha Merr.
- Veronica montana L.
- Veronica montbretii M.A.Fisch.
- Veronica monticola Trautv.
- Veronica mooreae (Heads) Garn.-Jones
- Veronica morrisonicola Hayata
- Veronica multifida L.
- Veronica muratae T.Yamaz.
- Veronica murrellii (G.Simpson & J.S.Thomson) Garn.-Jones
- Veronica × myriantha Tosh.Tanaka
- Veronica nakaiana Ohwi
- Veronica nevadensis (Pau) Pau
- Veronica nipponica Makino ex Furumi
- Veronica nivea Lindl.
- Veronica notabilis F.Muell. ex Benth.
- Veronica notialis Garn.-Jones
- Veronica novae-hollandiae Poir.
- Veronica nummularia Gouan

== O ==
- Veronica oblongifolia (Pennell) M.M.Mart.Ort. & Albach
- Veronica obtusata Cheeseman
- Veronica ochracea (Ashwin) Garn.-Jones
- Veronica odora Hook.f.
- Veronica oetaea Gustavsson
- Veronica officinalis L.
- Veronica ogurae (T.Yamaz.) Albach
- Veronica olgensis Kom.
- Veronica oligosperma Hayata
- Veronica oltensis Woronow
- Veronica onoei Franch. & Sav.
- Veronica opaca Fr.
- Veronica orbiculata A.Kern.
- Veronica orchidea Crantz
- Veronica orientalis Mill.
- Veronica ornata Monjuschko
- Veronica orsiniana Ten.
- Veronica ovata Nakai
- Veronica oxycarpa Boiss.
- Veronica ozturkii Yıld.

== P–Q ==
- Veronica paederotae Boiss.
- Veronica panormitana Tineo ex Guss.
- Veronica papuana (P.Royen & Ehrend.) Albach
- Veronica pareora (Garn.-Jones & Molloy) Garn.-Jones
- Veronica parnkalliana J.M.Black
- Veronica parviflora Vahl
- Veronica parvifolia Vahl
- Veronica pauciramosa (Cockayne & Allan) Garn.-Jones
- Veronica paysonii (Pennell & L.O.Williams) M.M.Mart.Ort. & Albach
- Veronica pectinata L.
- Veronica peduncularis M.Bieb.
- Veronica pentasepala (L.B.Moore) Garn.-Jones
- Veronica perbella (de Lange) Garn.-Jones
- Veronica peregrina L.
- Veronica perfoliata R.Br.
- Veronica persica Poir.
- Veronica petraea Steven
- Veronica petriei (Buchanan) Kirk
- Veronica phormiiphila Garn.-Jones
- Veronica pimeleoides Hook.f.
- Veronica pinguifolia Hook.f.
- Veronica pinnata L.
- Veronica piroliformis Franch.
- Veronica planopetiolata G.Simpson & J.S.Thomson
- Veronica plantaginea E.James
- Veronica platycarpa Pennell
- Veronica plebeia R.Br.
- Veronica polifolia Benth.
- Veronica polita Fr.
- Veronica polium P.H.Davis
- Veronica poljensis Murb.
- Veronica ponae Gouan
- Veronica pontica (Rupr. ex Boiss.) Wettst.
- Veronica poppelwellii Cockayne
- Veronica porphyriana Pavlov
- Veronica praecox All.
- Veronica propinqua Cheeseman
- Veronica prostrata L.
- Veronica pubescens Banks & Sol. ex Benth.
- Veronica pulvinaris (Hook.f.) Cheeseman
- Veronica punicea Garn.-Jones
- Veronica pusanensis Y.N.Lee
- Veronica pusilla Kotschy ex Boiss.
- Veronica pyrethrina Nakai
- Veronica quadrifaria Kirk
- Veronica quezelii M.A.Fisch.

== R ==
- Veronica rakaiensis J.B.Armstr.
- Veronica ramosissima Boriss.
- Veronica ranunculina (Pennell) M.M.Mart.Ort. & Albach
- Veronica raoulii Hook.f.
- Veronica rapensis F.Br.
- Veronica rechingeri M.A.Fisch.
- Veronica regina-nivalis M.M.Mart.Ort. & Albach
- Veronica repens Clarion ex DC.
- Veronica reuteriana Boiss.
- Veronica reverdattoi Krasnob.
- Veronica rhodopea (Velen.) Degen ex Stoj. & Stef.
- Veronica riae H.J.P.Winkl.
- Veronica rigidula Cheeseman
- Veronica ritteriana (Eastw.) M.M.Mart.Ort. & Albach
- Veronica rivalis Garn.-Jones
- Veronica robusta (Prain) T.Yamaz.
- Veronica rockii H.L.Li
- Veronica rosea Desf.
- Veronica rotunda Nakai
- Veronica rubra (Douglas ex Hook.) M.M.Mart.Ort. & Albach
- Veronica rubrifolia Boiss.
- Veronica rupicola Cheeseman

== S ==
- Veronica sajanensis Printz
- Veronica salicifolia G.Forst.
- Veronica salicornioides Hook.f.
- Veronica samuelssonii Rech.f.
- Veronica × sapiehae (Błocki ex Holub) Albach
- Veronica × sapozhnikovii Kosachev
- Veronica sartoriana Boiss. & Heldr.
- Veronica satureiifolia Poit. & Turpin
- Veronica saturejoides Vis.
- Veronica saxicola (de Lange) Heenan
- Veronica scardica Griseb.
- Veronica schistosa E.A.Busch
- Veronica schizantha (Piper) M.M.Mart.Ort. & Albach
- Veronica × schmakovii Kosachev
- Veronica schmidtiana Regel
- Veronica scopulorum (Bayly, de Lange & Garn.-Jones) Garn.-Jones
- Veronica scrupea Garn.-Jones
- Veronica scutellata L.
- Veronica senex (Garn.-Jones) Garn.-Jones
- Veronica sennenii (Pau) M.M.Mart.Ort. & E.Rico
- Veronica serpyllifolia L.
- Veronica × sessiliflora Bunge
- Veronica siaretensis E.Lehm.
- Veronica sibthorpioides Debeaux ex Degen & Herv.
- Veronica sieboldiana Miq.
- Veronica simensis Fresen.
- Veronica × simmonsii Cockayne
- Veronica simulans Garn.-Jones
- Veronica × smirnovii Kosachev & D.A.German
- Veronica sobolifera B.G.Briggs & Ehrend.
- Veronica societatis (Bayly & Kellow) Garn.-Jones
- Veronica spathulata Benth.
- Veronica speciosa R.Cunn. ex A.Cunn.
- Veronica spectabilis (Garn.-Jones) Garn.-Jones
- Veronica spicata L.
- Veronica spirei Bonati
- Veronica spuria L.
- Veronica stamatiadae M.A.Fisch. & Greuter
- Veronica stelleri Pall. ex Schrad. & Link
- Veronica stenophylla Steud.
- Veronica steppacea Kotov
- Veronica stewartii Pennell
- Veronica stricta Banks & Sol. ex Benth.
- Veronica strictissima (Kirk) Garn.-Jones
- Veronica strigosa Albach
- Veronica stylophora Popov ex Vved.
- Veronica subalpina Cockayne
- Veronica subfulvida (G.Simpson & J.S.Thomson) Garn.-Jones
- Veronica sublobata M.A.Fisch.
- Veronica subsessilis (Miq.) Furumi
- Veronica subtilis B.G.Briggs & Ehrend.
- Veronica surculosa Boiss. & Balansa
- Veronica sutchuenensis Franch.
- Veronica syriaca Roem. & Schult.
- Veronica szechuanica Batalin

== T ==
- Veronica tairawhiti (B.D.Clarkson & Garn.-Jones) Garn.-Jones
- Veronica taiwanica T.Yamaz.
- Veronica taurica Willd.
- Veronica tauricola Bornm.
- Veronica teberdensis (Kem.-Nath.) Boriss.
- Veronica telephiifolia Vahl
- Veronica tenuifolia Asso
- Veronica tenuissima Boriss.
- Veronica tetragona Hook.
- Veronica tetrasticha Hook.f.
- Veronica teucrioides Boiss. & Heldr.
- Veronica teucrium L.
- Veronica thessalica Benth.
- Veronica thomsonii (Buchanan) Cheeseman
- Veronica thracica Velen.
- Veronica thymifolia Sm.
- Veronica thymoides P.H.Davis
- Veronica tianschanica Lincz.
- Veronica tibetica D.Y.Hong
- Veronica topiaria (L.B.Moore) Garn.-Jones
- Veronica townsonii Cheeseman
- Veronica traversii Hook.f.
- Veronica treadwellii (Cockayne & Allan) Garn.-Jones
- Veronica trichadena Jord. & Fourr.
- Veronica trifida Petrie
- Veronica triloba (Opiz) Opiz
- Veronica triphyllos L.
- Veronica truncatula Colenso
- Veronica tsinglingensis D.Y.Hong
- Veronica tubata (Diels) Albach
- Veronica tumadzhanovii Mardal.
- Veronica tumida Kirk
- Veronica turrilliana Stoj. & Stef.

== U–Z ==
- Veronica umbelliformis Pennell
- Veronica undulata Wall.
- Veronica × uniflora Kirk
- Veronica urticifolia Jacq.
- Veronica urvilleana (W.R.B.Oliv.) Garn.-Jones
- Veronica utahensis M.M.Mart.Ort. & Albach
- Veronica vandellioides Maxim.
- Veronica vandewateri Wernham
- Veronica velutina (B.G.Briggs & Ehrend.) B.G.Briggs
- Veronica vendettadeae Albach
- Veronica venustula Colenso
- Veronica verna L.
- Veronica vernicosa Hook.f.
- Veronica viscosa Boiss.
- Veronica × wallii Garn.-Jones
- Veronica wilhelminensis Albach
- Veronica wormskjoldii Roem. & Schult.
- Veronica wyomingensis (A.Nelson) M.M.Mart.Ort. & Albach
- Veronica yildirimlii Öztürk
- Veronica yunnanensis D.Y.Hong
- Veronica zygantha Garn.-Jones
