= Veronica angustifolia =

Veronica angustifolia is a botanical synonym of five species of plant:

- Veronica austriaca, synonym published in 1806 by Johann Jakob Bernhardi
- Veronica ligustrifolia, synonym published in 1838 by Allan Cunningham
- Veronica linariifolia, synonym published in 1821 by Johann Heinrich Friedrich Link
- Veronica scutellata, synonym published in 1822 by Samuel Frederick Gray
- Veronica stenophylla, synonym published in 1832 by Achille Richard
