= Derwentia (plant) =

Genus of flowering plants

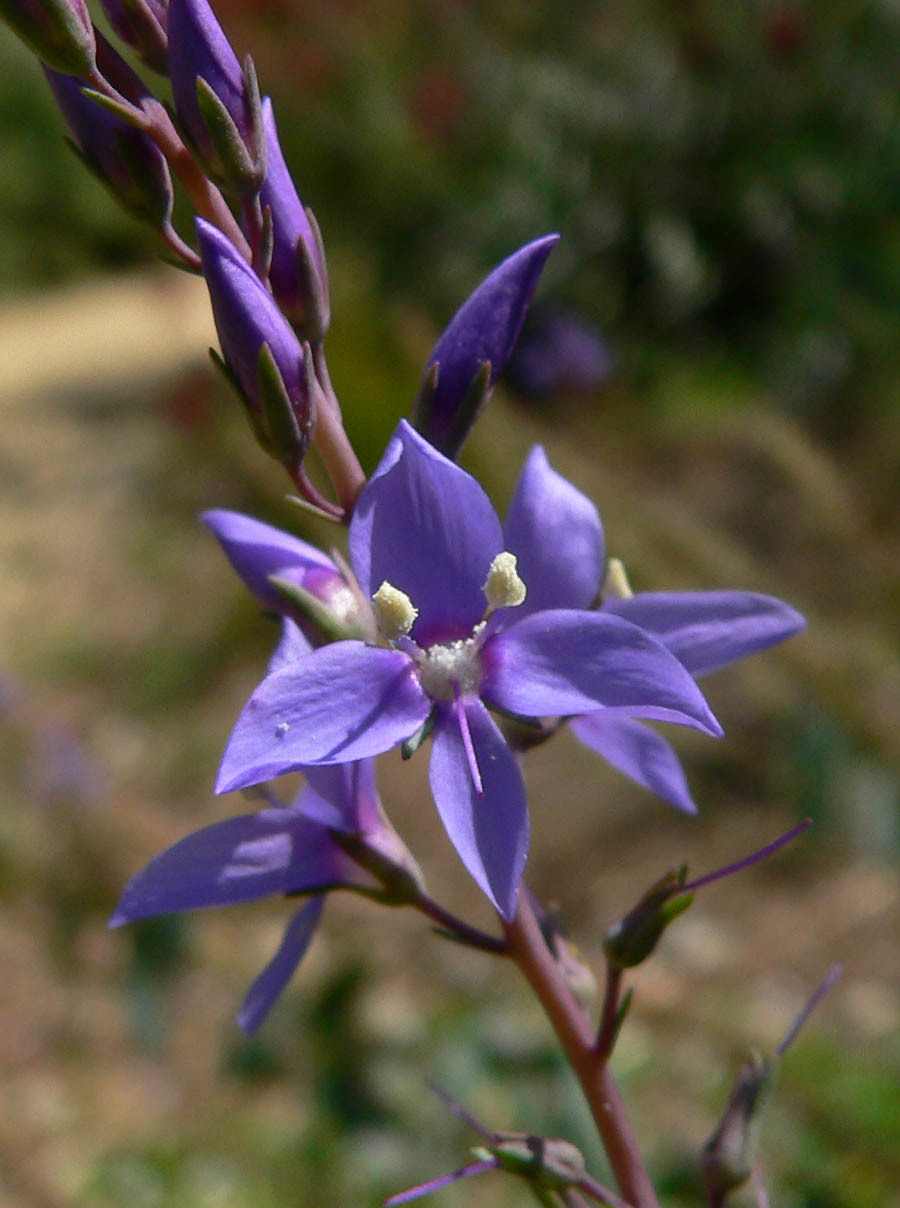
Derwentia perfoliata

Derwentia is a genus of flowering plants that is endemic to Australia. The genus was formerly included in the family Scrophulariaceae, but is currently included in Plantaginaceae, and is treated as a synonym of the genus Veronica.

All species are currently placed in the genus Veronica as follows:

- Derwentia arcuata B.G.Briggs & Ehrend. → Veronica arcuata (B.G.Briggs & Ehrend.) B.G.Briggs
- Derwentia arenaria (A.Cunn. ex Benth. ) B.G.Briggs & Ehrend → Veronica arenaria A.Cunn. ex Benth. .
- Derwentia blakelyi B.G.Briggs & Ehrend. → Veronica blakelyi (B.G.Briggs & Ehrend.) B.G.Briggs
- Derwentia decorosa (F.Muell.) B.G.Briggs & Ehrend. → Veronica decorosa F.Muell.
- Derwentia derwentiana (Andrews) B.G.Briggs & Ehrend. → Veronica derwentiana Andrews
- Derwentia formosa (R.Br.) Bayly → Veronica formosa R.Br.
- Derwentia nivea (Lindl.) B.G.Briggs & Ehrend. → Veronica nivea Lindl.
- Derwentia perfoliata (R.Br.) Raf. → Veronica perfoliata R.Br.
- Derwentia velutina B.G.Briggs & Ehrend. → Veronica velutina (B.G.Briggs & Ehrend.) B.G.Briggs
