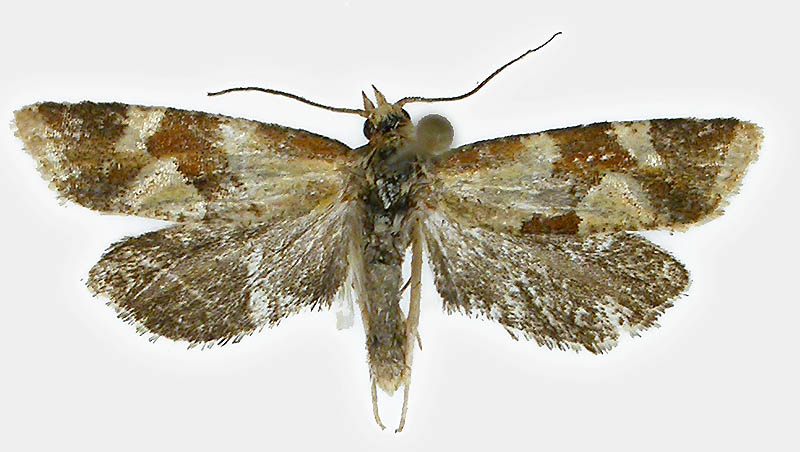

Scientific classification
- Domain: Eukaryota
- Kingdom: Animalia
- Phylum: Arthropoda
- Class: Insecta
- Order: Lepidoptera
- Family: Tortricidae
- Genus: Aethes
- Species: A. triangulana

Binomial name
- Aethes triangulana (Treitschke, 1835)

Synonyms
- Tortrix triangulana Treitschke, 1835; Tortrix kuhlweiniana Fischer von Röslerstamm, 1836; Tortrix tergana Eversmann, 1844; Cochylis excellentana Christoph, 1881; Aethes excellentana (Christoph, 1881)

= Aethes triangulana =

Species of moth

Aethes triangulana is a moth of the family Tortricidae. It was described by Treitschke in 1835. It is found from most of Europe to Central Asia, the Amur region, China and Japan.

The wingspan is 18–22 millimetres (0.71–0.87 in). The moth flies from May to June.

The larvae feed on Veronica longifolia.

== Subspecies ==
- Aethes triangulana triangulana
- Aethes triangulana excellentana (Christoph, 1881) (Russia: Ussuri, Amur; Japan; China: Heilongjiang, Henan)
