= Derwentia =

Derwentia is the scientific name of two genera of organisms and may refer to:

- Derwentia (amphibian), a genus of prehistoric amphibians in the family Rhytidosteidae
- Derwentia (plant), a genus of plants in the family Plantaginaceae
