= Veronica buxbaumii =

Veronica buxbaumii can refer to:

- Veronica buxbaumii F.W.Schmidt, a synonym of Veronica pectinata L. var. pectinata
- Veronica buxbaumii Ten., a synonym of Veronica persica Poir.
