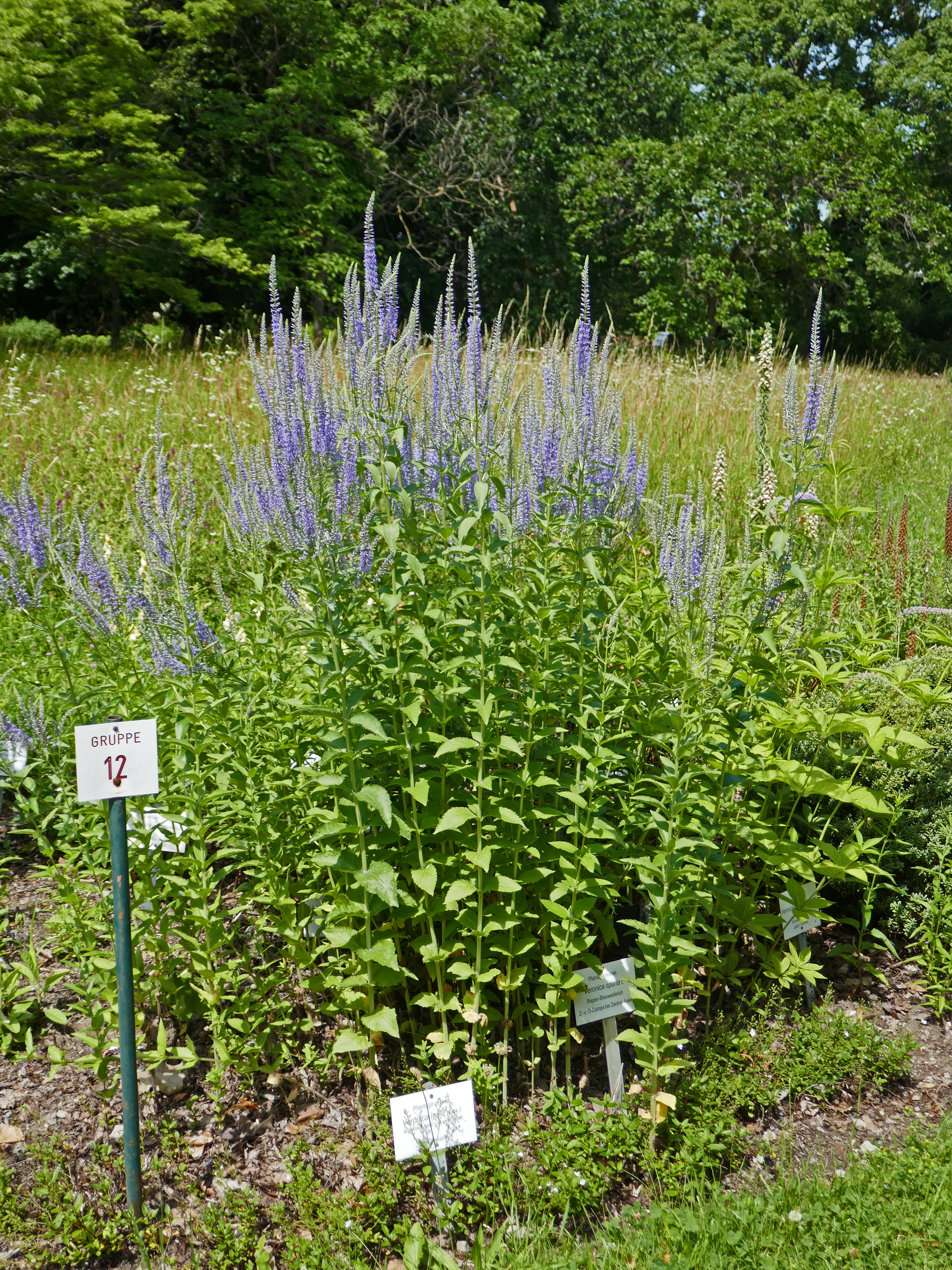

Scientific classification
- Kingdom: Plantae
- Clade: Tracheophytes
- Clade: Angiosperms
- Clade: Eudicots
- Clade: Asterids
- Order: Lamiales
- Family: Plantaginaceae
- Genus: Veronica
- Species: V. spuria

Binomial name
- Veronica spuria L.

Synonyms
- Pseudolysimachion spurium (L.) Rauschert; Veronica paniculata L.

= Veronica spuria =

Species of flowering plant in the plantain family

Veronica spuria, the bastard speedwell is a perennial flower in the Plantaginaceae family native in eastern Europe and western Asia.

== Description ==
A tall (30 to 100 cm), perennial, speedwell, with long floral spikes of blue to purple flowers. It is rather similar to the familiar garden speedwell but the topmost floral display is much more branched, with numerous branches of flowers emerging from leaf bases at lower levels. The flowers by comparison are larger (7–14 mm vs. 4–8 mm), on longer stalks ((2)3–5 mm vs. 1–2 mm), and they mature into capsules (2.5-4 x 2–3 mm).

Photographic examples can be seen on iNaturalist.

== Distribution and habitat ==
Its native range is Altay, Austria, Baltic States, Belarus, Bulgaria, Central European Russia, Czechoslovakia, East European Russia, Hungary, Kazakhstan, Kyrgyzstan, Mongolia, North Caucasus, North European Russia, Poland, Romania, South European Russia, Tadzhikistan, Ukraine, West Siberia, Xinjiang, Yugoslavia, doubtfully present in Germany, Italy, and introduced into Vermont

In NW Xinjiang its habitat is mountain slopes, steppes, c. 1100 m.

In Europe its habitat is grassy and rocky places.
