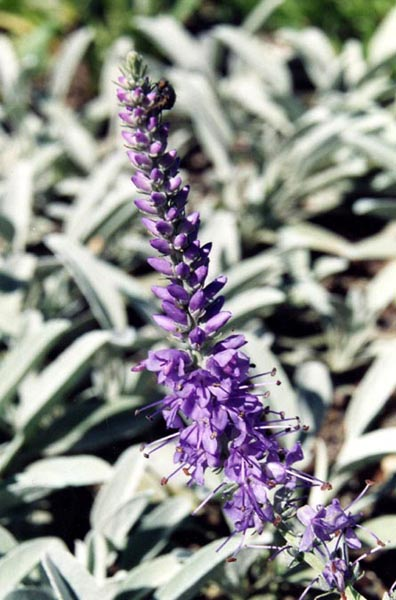
- Flower spike
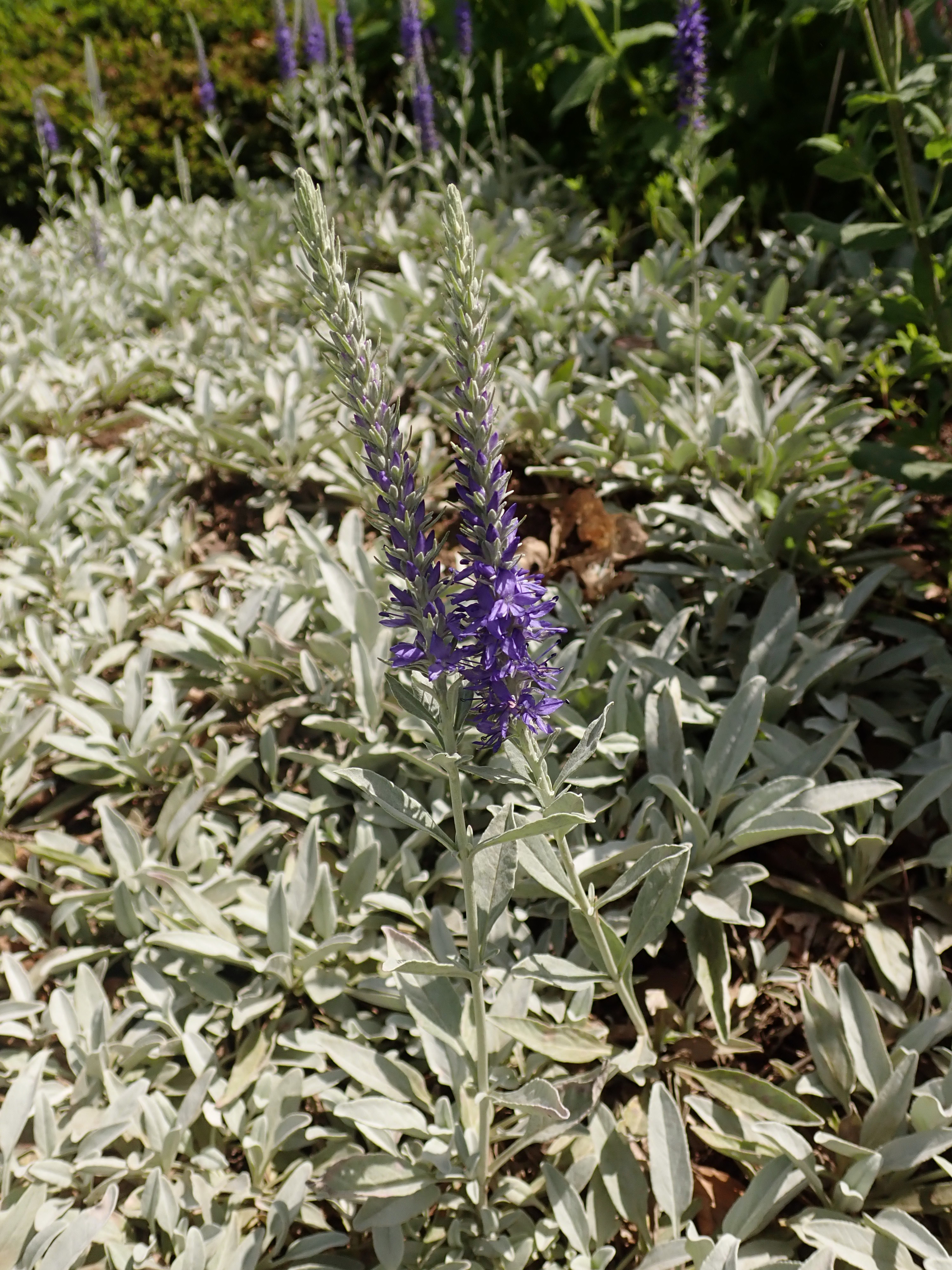
- 'Silberteppich' cultivar

Scientific classification
- Kingdom: Plantae
- Clade: Tracheophytes
- Clade: Angiosperms
- Clade: Eudicots
- Clade: Asterids
- Order: Lamiales
- Family: Plantaginaceae
- Genus: Veronica
- Species: V. incana

Binomial name
- Veronica incana L.

Synonyms
- List: Pseudolysimachion incanum (L.) Holub; Pseudolysimachion incanum subsp. pallens (Host) Trávn.; Pseudolysimachion pallens (Host) M.A.Fisch.; Pseudolysimachion semiglabratum (Ostapko) Ostapko; Veronica bellidifolia Juz.; Veronica callistachya Ledeb. ex Loudon; Veronica canescens Schrad.; Veronica hololeuca Juz.; Veronica incana subsp. hololeuca (Juz.) Elenevsky; Veronica incana subsp. pallens (Host) Albach; Veronica pallens Host; Veronica semiglabrata Ostapko; Veronica sergievskiana Polozhij; Veronica spicata subsp. incana (L.) Walters; Veronica xilinensis Y.Z.Zhao

= Veronica incana =

Species of flowering plant

Veronica incana, the silver speedwell, is a species of flowering plant in the family Plantaginaceae. It is native to parts of Eastern Europe and Russia, all of Siberia, Mongolia, and northern China, and has been introduced to Czechoslovakia. A number of authorities consider it to be a subspecies of the spiked speedwell Veronica spicata; Veronica spicata subsp. incana. It is a parent of the hybrids Veronica × czemalensis (with V. porphyriana) and Veronica × grisea (with V. longifolia).
