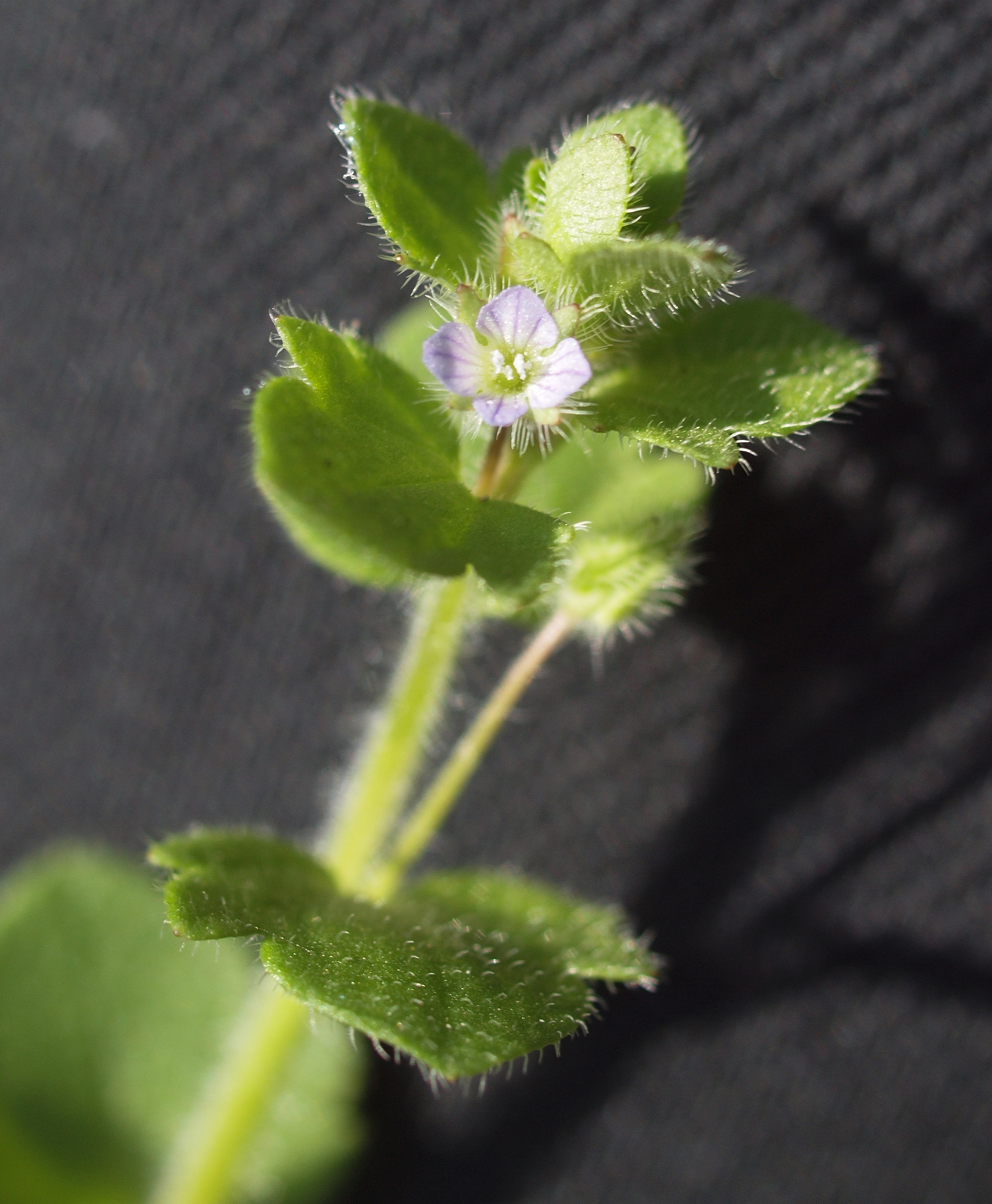

Scientific classification
- Kingdom: Plantae
- Clade: Tracheophytes
- Clade: Angiosperms
- Clade: Eudicots
- Clade: Asterids
- Order: Lamiales
- Family: Plantaginaceae
- Genus: Veronica
- Species: V. sublobata

Binomial name
- Veronica sublobata M.A.Fisch.

Synonyms
- Cochlidiosperma sublobata (M.A.Fisch.) D.Y.Hong & S.Nilsson; Veronica hederifolia var. lucorum Klett & Richt.; Veronica hederifolia subsp. lucorum (Klett & Richt.) Hartl

= Veronica sublobata =

Species of flowering plant

Veronica sublobata, commonly known as the false ivy-leaved speedwell, is a species of flowering plant in the genus Veronica. It is native to Europe. It has naturalized in the United States.

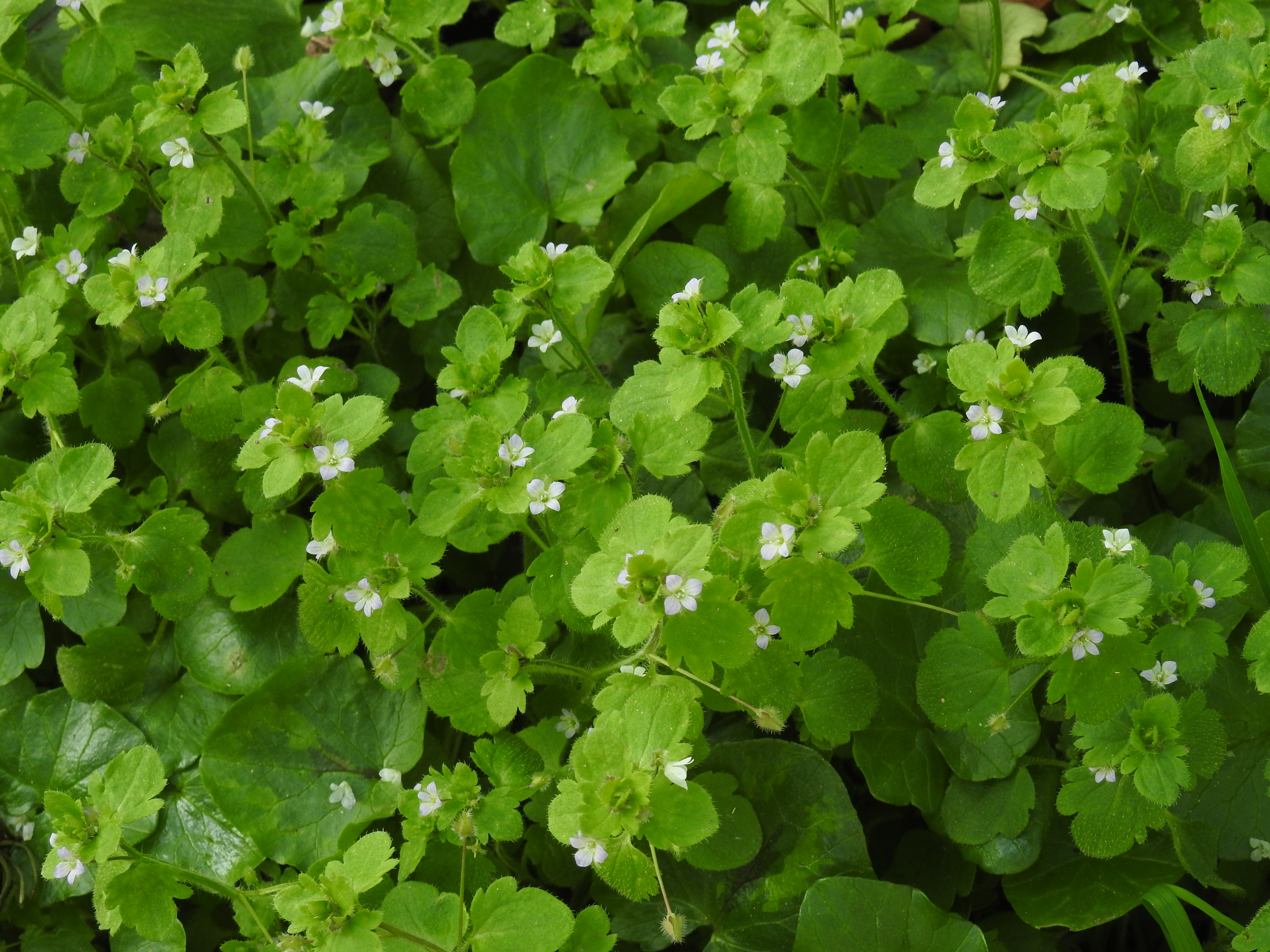
Tends to spread out

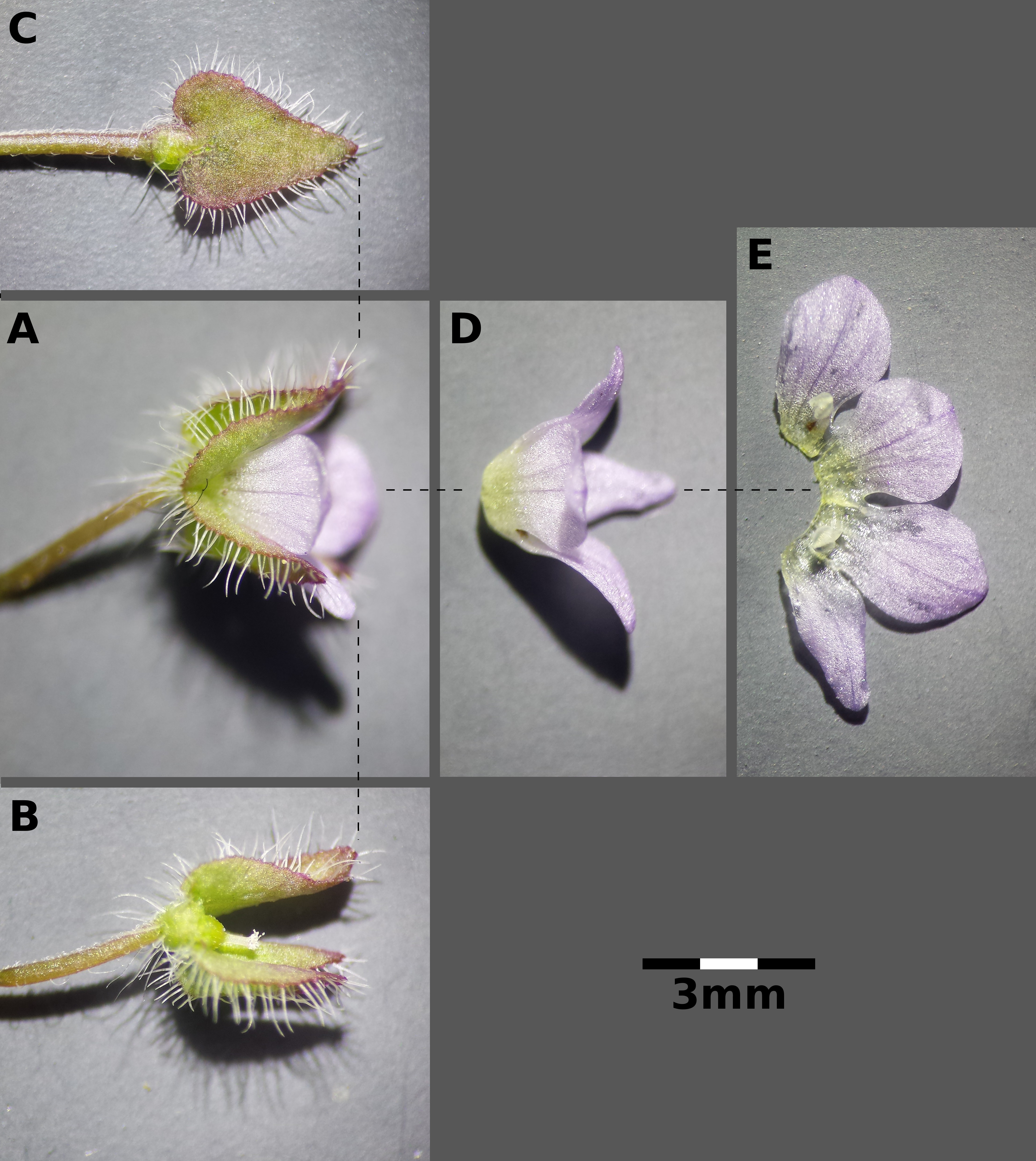
A dissected flower

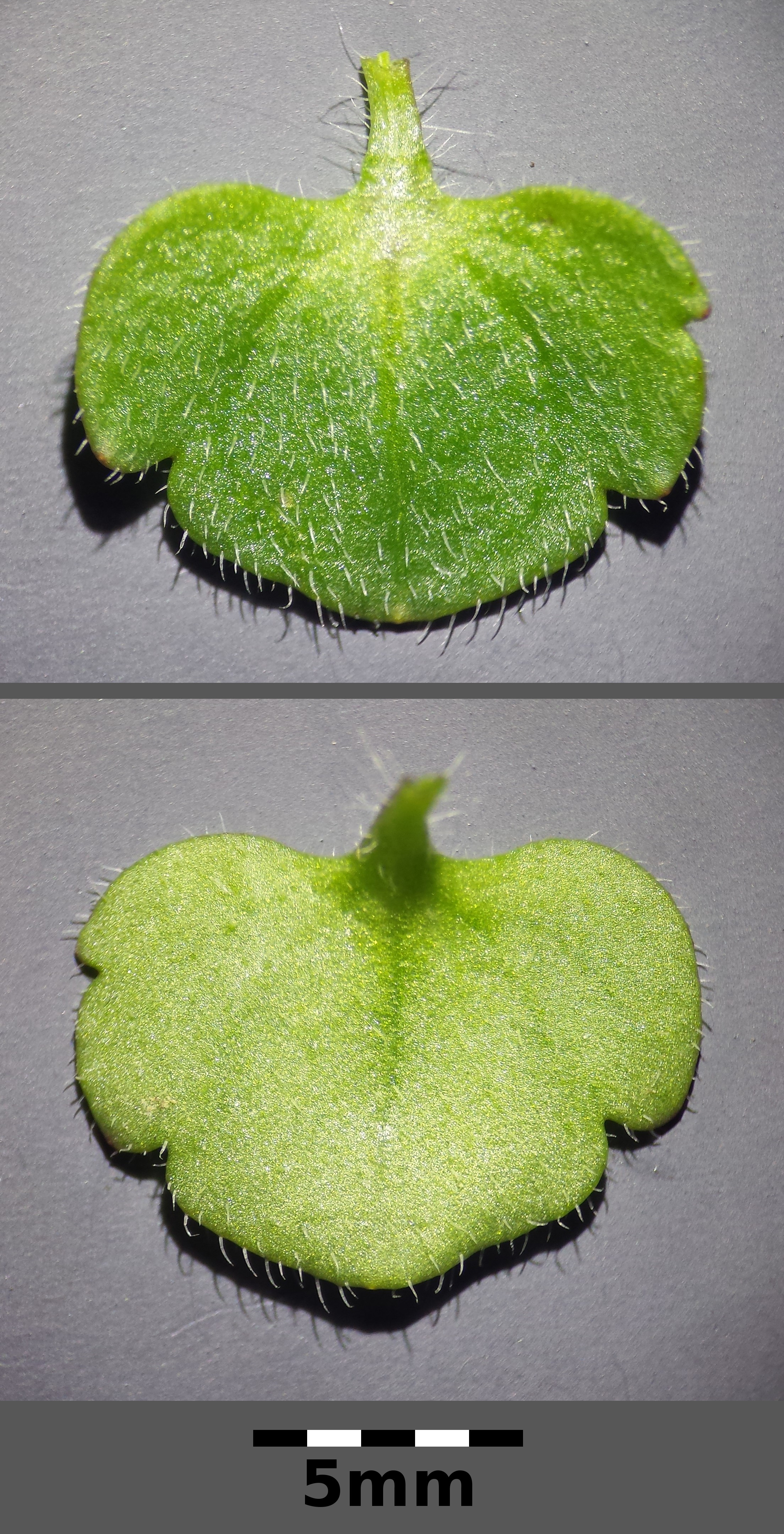
Leaf surface and underside
