= Veronica grisebachii =

Scientific classification
- Kingdom: Plantae
- Clade: Embryophytes
- Clade: Tracheophytes
- Clade: Spermatophytes
- Clade: Angiosperms
- Clade: Eudicots
- Clade: Asterids
- Order: Lamiales
- Family: Plantaginaceae
- Genus: Veronica
- Species: V. grisebachii

Binomial name
- Veronica grisebachii Walters

Species of flowering plant

Veronica grisebachii is a small flower in the family Plantaginaceae native from Bulgaria to Turkey.

== Description ==
A small, annual, blue-flowered speedwell, growing upright to 15(20) cm, often very branched, covered with stiff, moderately-sized hairs. It has deeply-divided stem leaves (3–5 parted), but with the lowest only poorly divided or not at all; its blue flowers are 8–12 mm across with darker blue veins, however the flowers are occasionally white with blue veins, and at the centre the style is moderately long (2–4 mm), eventually fruiting with narrowly triangular capsules (3.5–4.5 mm long).

== Distribution and habitat ==
Its native range is Bulgaria, Greece and Turkey.

In Turkey its habitat is open macchie, Pinus forests, steppe, scree, fields, 700–1,600 m (2,300–5,200 ft).
