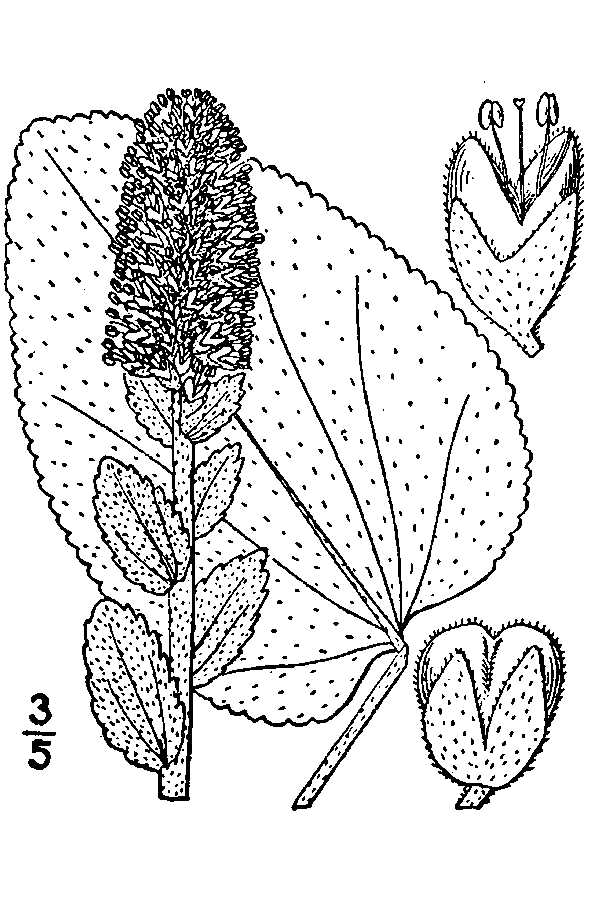

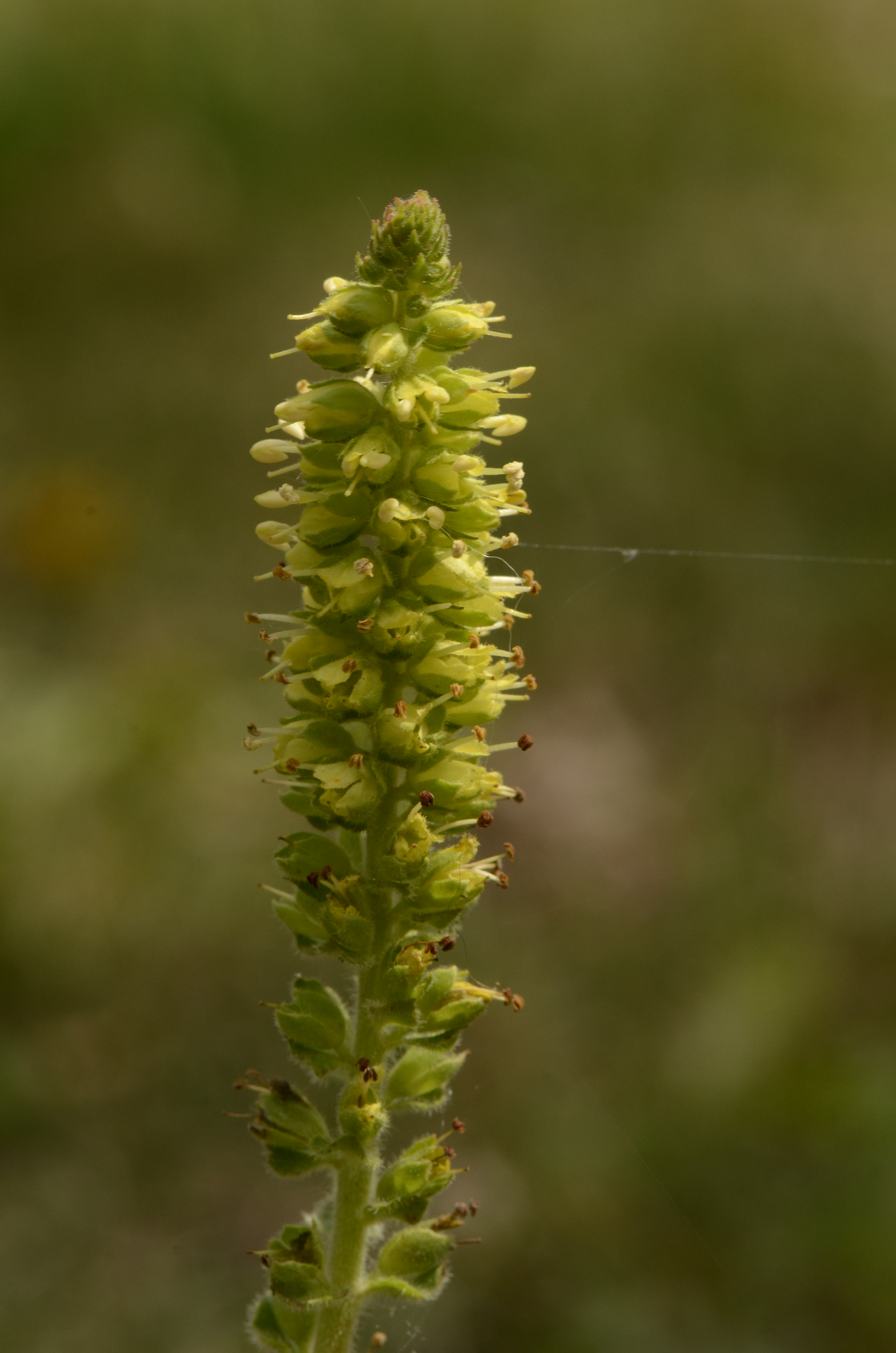

Conservation status
- Vulnerable (NatureServe)

Scientific classification
- Kingdom: Plantae
- Clade: Tracheophytes
- Clade: Angiosperms
- Clade: Eudicots
- Clade: Asterids
- Order: Lamiales
- Family: Plantaginaceae
- Genus: Veronica
- Species: V. bullii

Binomial name
- Veronica bullii (Eaton) Rydb.

Synonyms
- Besseya bullii (Eaton) Rydb.; Gymnandra bullii Eaton; Synthyris bullii (Eaton) A. Heller; Wulfenia bullii (Eaton) Barnhart

= Veronica bullii =

Species of flowering plant

Veronica bullii is a species of flowering plant in the plantain family known by the common names kittentails and Bull's coraldrops. It is native to the Upper Midwest of the United States, including the states of Ohio, Indiana, Illinois, Wisconsin, Iowa, and Minnesota.

== Description ==
Veronica bullii forms a low-lying rosette of basal leaves that are large, covered with fine hairs, and many-veined. The yellowish flowers are arranged into a spike that is densely packed when flowers are blooming and well-separated when in fruit. The stem leaves are greatly reduced, arranged alternately, and partly clasp the stems. The flowers are sessile with two lips, and the lower lip of each flower corolla is unlobed or divided into two or three lobes. Two long stamens protrude past the corolla lobes. Flowering occurs in April through June and the flowering stems remain after flowering until the end of summer. Pollinated flowers develop hairy two-lobed capsules that open at the top when ripe.

== Habitat ==
Veronica bullii is limited to specific habitats, preferring gravelly soils in prairies, grasslands, savannas, and woodlands.

== Distribution ==
Veronica bullii is endemic to the Midwestern region of the United States where it is rare or endangered over its entire range and likely extinct in Ohio. It occurs in Indiana, Illinois, Wisconsin, Iowa, and Minnesota.
