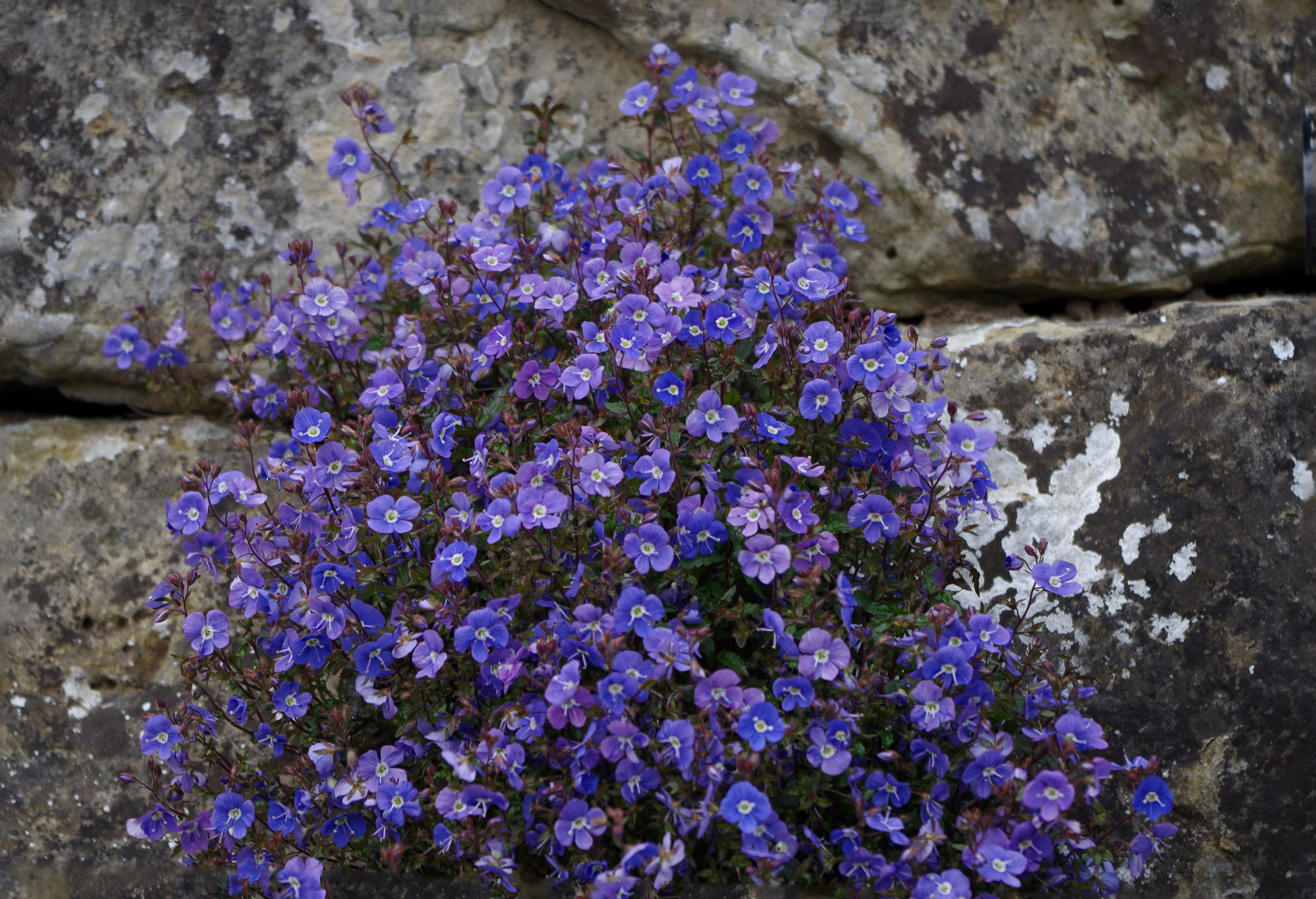
- Veronica peduncularis 'Georgia Blue' at Kew Gardens

Conservation status
- Naturally Uncommon (NZ TCS)

Scientific classification
- Kingdom: Plantae
- Clade: Embryophytes
- Clade: Tracheophytes
- Clade: Spermatophytes
- Clade: Angiosperms
- Clade: Eudicots
- Clade: Asterids
- Order: Lamiales
- Family: Plantaginaceae
- Genus: Veronica
- Species: V. peduncularis

Binomial name
- Veronica peduncularis M.Bieb.

Synonyms
- List: Veronica benthamii K.Koch ex Boiss.; Veronica drymeja Schur; Veronica nemorum Pall. ex Link; Veronica nigricans K.Koch; Veronica pedunculata M.Bieb.; Veronica phoenicantha K.Koch; Veronica secundiflora K.Koch; Veronica umbrosa M.Bieb.

= Veronica peduncularis =

Species of flowering plant

Veronica peduncularis, the creeping speedwell, is a flowering plant in the plantain family, Plantaginaceae. Listed under its synonym Veronica umbrosa, its cultivar 'Georgia Blue' has gained the Royal Horticultural Society's Award of Garden Merit.

It is a semi-evergreen perennial with alternate, simple leaves on creeping stems. The flowers are blue, and borne in spring. Though hardy, it requires a sheltered spot in full sun with good drainage. It is a suitable subject for a gravel garden or alpine garden.
