= Veronica brownii =

Scientific classification
- Kingdom: Plantae
- Clade: Embryophytes
- Clade: Tracheophytes
- Clade: Spermatophytes
- Clade: Angiosperms
- Clade: Eudicots
- Clade: Asterids
- Order: Lamiales
- Family: Plantaginaceae
- Genus: Veronica
- Species: V. brownii

Binomial name
- Veronica brownii Roem. & Schult.

Synonyms
- Veronica arguta R.Br.; Veronica brownei Roem. & Schult. orth. var.; Veronica gracilis var. arguta (R.Br.) C.Moore & Betche

Species of flowering plant

Veronica brownii is a plant belonging to the family Plantaginaceae native to New South Wales in Australia, where it is restricted to the Blue Mountains. It has arching branches with variable shaped leaves and lilac flowers in spring and summer.

== Description ==
Veronica brownii is a perennial herb with slender arching decumbent branches about 50 cm (20 in) long with pale lilac flowers at the end of the stems. The stems have lateral bands of fine, stiff hairs 0.1–0.2 mm (0.0039–0.0079 in) long and curved downward. The stems occasionally arise from a leaf or branch node. The leaves may be broad to narrow egg-shaped or more or less triangular, usually 0.8–2 centimetres (0.31–0.79 in) long and 2.5–15 mm (0.098–0.591 in) wide, sharply pointed or tapering gradually to a point. The leaf stalk is 1.5–5 mm (0.059–0.197 in) long and the leaf margin has 2-5 pairs of deep sharp teeth. The inflorescence is a slender raceme about 3.5 cm (1.4 in) long with 3-15 flowers per stem on a peduncle 1.5–4.5 cm (0.59–1.77 in) long. The flower bracts are 2–6 mm (0.079–0.236 in) long, the pedicel 8–15 mm (0.31–0.59 in) long. The flower petals are 3.5–4 mm (0.14–0.16 in) long and pale lilac. Flowers from spring to summer. The seed capsules are egg-shaped 2–4 mm (0.079–0.157 in) long and 3.5–5.0 mm (0.14–0.20 in) wide, smooth or sparsely covered in fine hairs less than 0.1 mm (0.0039 in) long.

== Taxonomy and naming ==
Veronica brownii was first formally described in 1817 by Johann Jacob Roemer and Josef August Schultes and the description was published in Systema Vegetabilium.

== Distribution and habitat ==
This species is endemic to New South Wales and grows in eucalyptus forest in valleys of the Blue Mountains at generally altitudes from 350–1,000 m (1,150–3,280 ft) metres.
