= Veronica pusanensis =

Scientific classification
- Kingdom: Plantae
- Clade: Embryophytes
- Clade: Tracheophytes
- Clade: Spermatophytes
- Clade: Angiosperms
- Clade: Eudicots
- Clade: Asterids
- Order: Lamiales
- Family: Plantaginaceae
- Genus: Veronica
- Species: V. pusanensis

Binomial name
- Veronica pusanensis Y.N.Lee (2004)

Synonyms
- Pseudolysimachion pusanensis

Species of flowering plant

Veronica pusanensis is a plant in the Plantaginaceae family, which is endemic to South Korea.

The plant was first described in 2004 as Veronica pusanensis by Y.N.Lee. In 2005 he reassigned it to the genus, Pseudolysimachion. The species epithet, pusanensis, describes the plant as coming from Busan.

It is a perennial herb with opposite leaves. The leaves and stems have a covering of white fine hairs. The blue flowers bloom in July and August, in a racemose inflorescence. The flowers have one pistil and two stamens and the fruit is a capsule.

== Distribution ==
This plant is native to South Korea where it grows on the coast of Busan.
