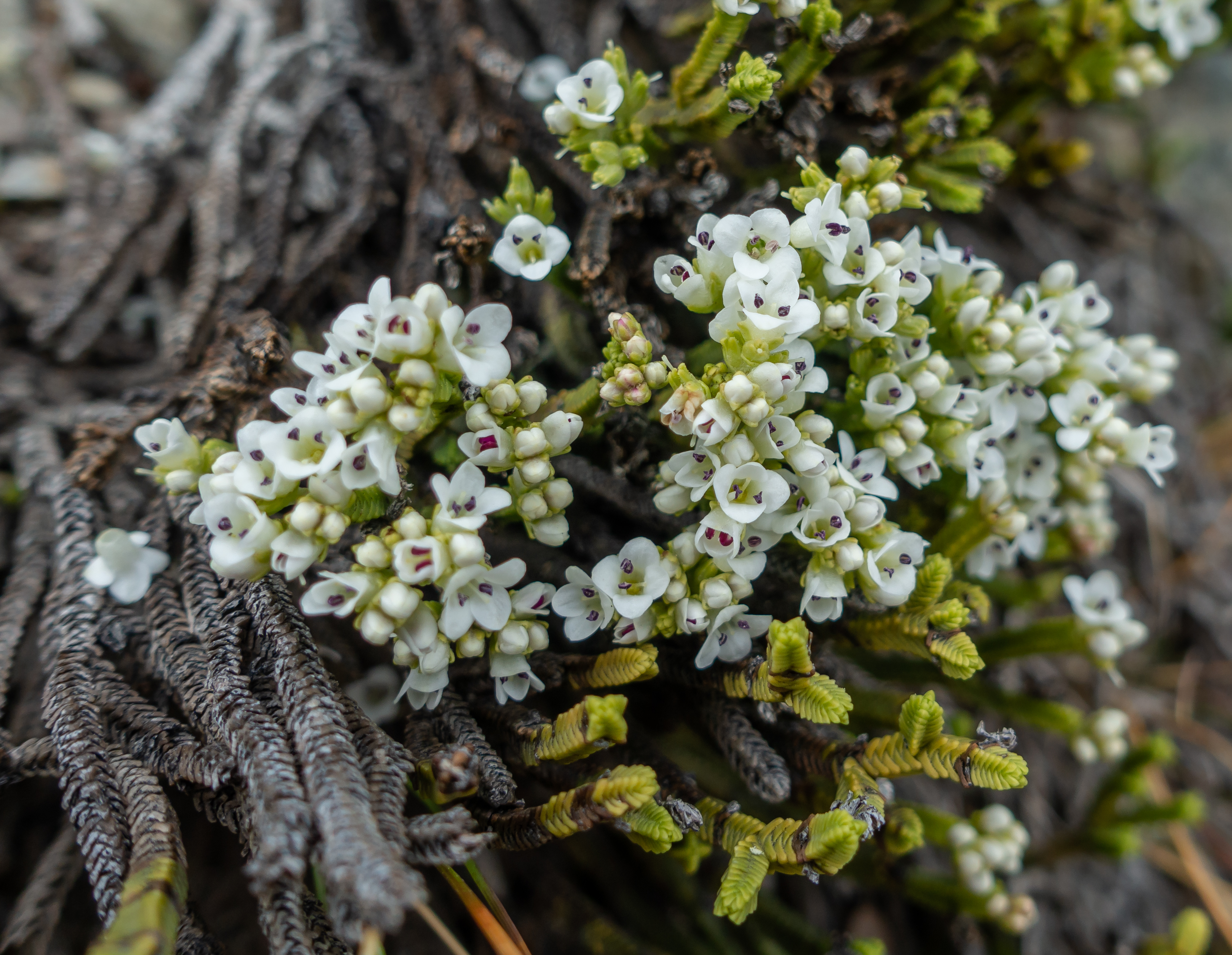
- Veronica lycopodioides on Helicopter Hill, Canterbury

Conservation status
- Not Threatened (NZ TCS)

Scientific classification
- Kingdom: Plantae
- Clade: Embryophytes
- Clade: Tracheophytes
- Clade: Spermatophytes
- Clade: Angiosperms
- Clade: Eudicots
- Clade: Asterids
- Order: Lamiales
- Family: Plantaginaceae
- Genus: Veronica
- Species: V. lycopodioides

Binomial name
- Veronica lycopodioides Hook.f.

= Veronica lycopodioides =

Species of flowering plant

Veronica lycopodioides, or whipchord hebe, is a species of hebe which is endemic to New Zealand.

== Description ==
Veronica lycopodioides is a short, erect shrub with branches whose leaves grow close to the stem, causing the branches themselves to look scaly and green. The leaves are triangular, have a pointed tip, and may have hair on the margin which can be seen with a hand lens. White flowers, in groups of 6–16, burst from the tip of the terminal branches.

The pointed tips of the leaves can be used in the field to distinguish this species from Veronica poppelwellii.

A subspecies, Veronica lycopodioides var. patula, is smaller in most respects.

== Distribution and habitat ==
Veronica lycopodioides grows on the South Island of New Zealand, typically to the east of the central spine of the Southern Alps. It grows on penalpine grassland, and in subalpine areas. It may grow on Stewart Island.

It is not currently considered threatened.

== Etymology ==
Lycopodioides refers to the similarity of this species to Lycopodium club-mosses.

== Taxonomy ==
This species was first published in 1864 by Joseph Hooker. The lectotype was designated in 2004, with a specimen from Wairau Valley.
