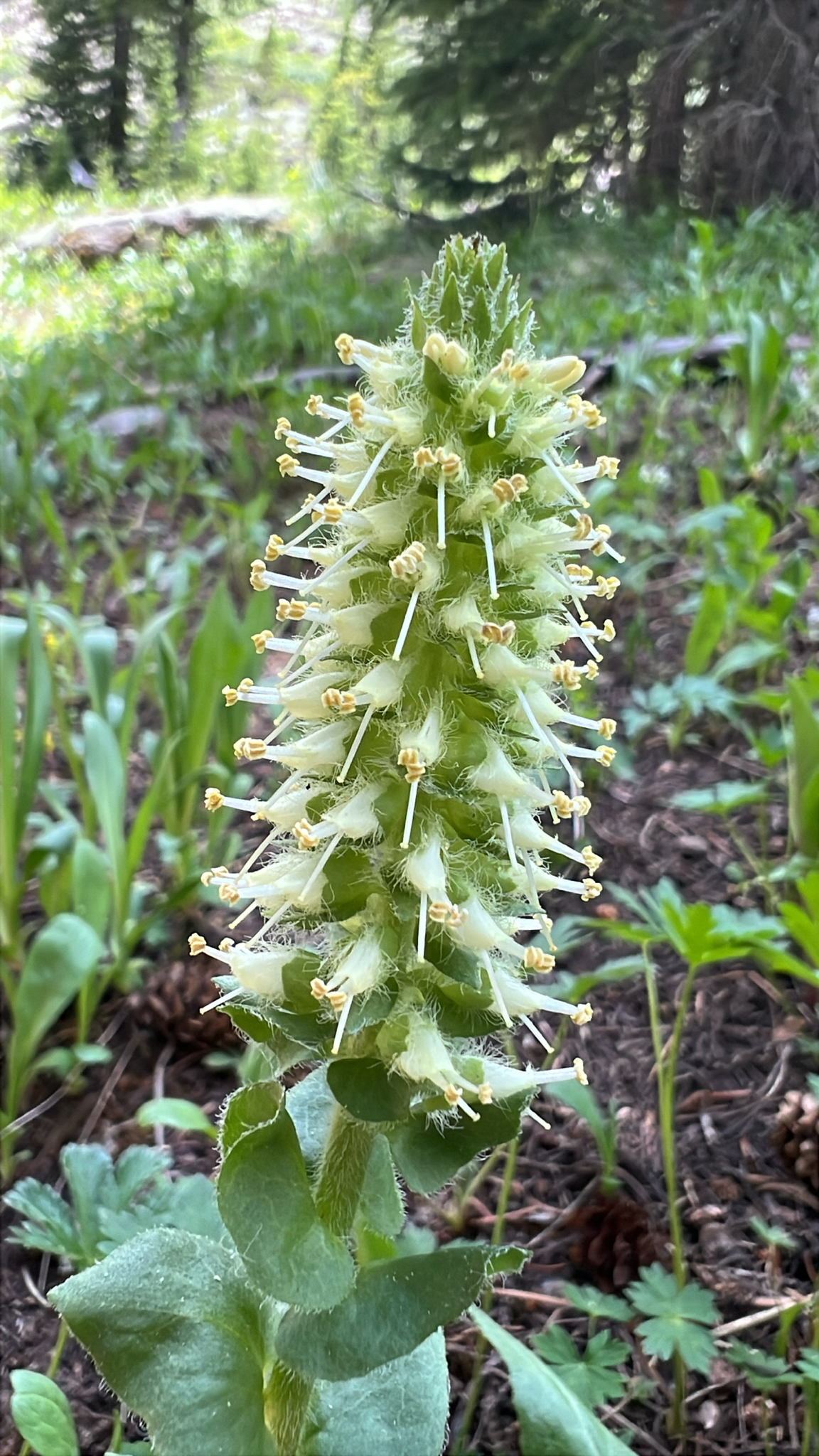
- Lizard Head Trail south of Telluride, Colorado

Conservation status
- Vulnerable (NatureServe)

Scientific classification
- Kingdom: Plantae
- Clade: Tracheophytes
- Clade: Angiosperms
- Clade: Eudicots
- Clade: Asterids
- Order: Lamiales
- Family: Plantaginaceae
- Genus: Veronica
- Species: V. ritteriana

Binomial name
- Veronica ritteriana (Eastw.) M.M.Mart.Ort. & Albach

Synonyms
- Besseya ritteriana; Synthyris ritteriana

= Veronica ritteriana =

Plant species in the veronica family

Veronica ritteriana, botanical synonyms Besseya ritteriana and Synthyris ritteriana, is a herbaceous plant species in the veronica family from the mountains of southwestern Colorado. It is commonly called Ritter's kittentails or Ritter's coraldrops.

== Description ==
Ritter's kittentails have inflorescences that typically grow 20 to 35 centimeters (8–14 in) tall, but occasionally will be as short as 15 cm (6 in). They are rhizomatous, having modified underground stems, and perennials.

Plants have both basal leaves and leaves attached to the stems. The basal leaves are larger and on long leaf stems 2.5–12 cm (1–4.5 in) long. They are elliptic to oblong in shape with sparse hairs on the underside and nearly hairless or just fringed along with edge with hairs on the upper surface; they measure 5–15 cm (2–6 in) long and 1.5–7 cm (0.5–3 in) wide. The leaves attached to flowering stems are almost like bracts and have very short leaf stems or are attached directly by the leaf base.

The inflorescence is an raceme that is nearly a spike, sometimes with more than 100 flowers. The sepals are partly fused and usually have three or four lobes, but can have five, and are covered in long, soft hairs and edged with hairs as well. The flowers usually have three lemon-yellow petals, but can have four, longer than the sepals. The stamens extend out of the flowers, measuring 6–8 millimeters, with pale or white filaments. Blooming is as early as May or as late as October.

== Taxonomy ==
Veronica ritteriana was scientifically described by Alice Eastwood in 1892 who named it Synthyris ritteriana. Eastwood collected the type specimen she described from the Cumberland Basin in the La Plata Mountains in August 1892. In 2004 María Montserrat Martínez Ortega and Dirk C. Albach moved it to the genus Veronica, along with many other species formerly placed in Synthyris and Besseya, on the basis that the difference of having a rosette made them insufficiently different from other species in the larger genus, giving the species its accepted name. Many sources such as the Flora of North America continue to use the name Synthyris ritteriana and the Natural Resources Conservation Service uses the name Besseya ritteriana, but Veronica ritteriana is the accepted name according to Plants of the World Online.

The species has six synonyms.

Table of Synonyms
Name	Year	Rank	Notes
Besseya reflexa (Eastw.) Rydb.	1903	species	= het.
Besseya ritteriana (Eastw.) Rydb.	1903	species	≡ hom.
Synthyris flavescens A.Nelson	1903	species	= het.
Synthyris reflexa Eastw.	1898	species	= het.
Synthyris ritteriana Eastw.	1898	species	≡ hom.
Synthyris ritteriana var. obtusa A.Nelson	1902	variety	= het.
Notes: ≡ homotypic synonym ; = heterotypic synonym

=== Names ===
The species name, ritteriana, honors Benjamin W. and Jeanette T. Ritter, a married couple from Durango, Colorado who assisted Eastwood in a collecting trip to the area. Benjamin was lawyer in Durango and Jeanette was Durango Library Board member. The common name Ritter's kittentails also references the couple. It is additionally called Ritter's coraldrops, sometimes spelled Ritter's coral-drops.

== Range and habitat ==
Ritter's kittentails are endemic to southwestern Colorado. There they grow in eight counties, the northern most is Gunnison County. The species is mainly found in the La Plata and San Juan mountains with only the populations in Gunnison and Montrose counties outside these mountain ranges. They can be found at elevations of 2,100 to 3,800 meters (6,900–12,500 ft). They grow in moist meadows, on cliffs, and stream banks near and above timberline.

=== Conservation ===
When reviewed by NatureServe in 2006 they rated Ritter's kittentails as vulnerable. Though not widespread it is locally very common. It might be threaten by long term drought in the ongoing Southwestern North American drought. They also noted sheep grazing occurs at several locations and the species needs monitoring to see if this impacts the population.
