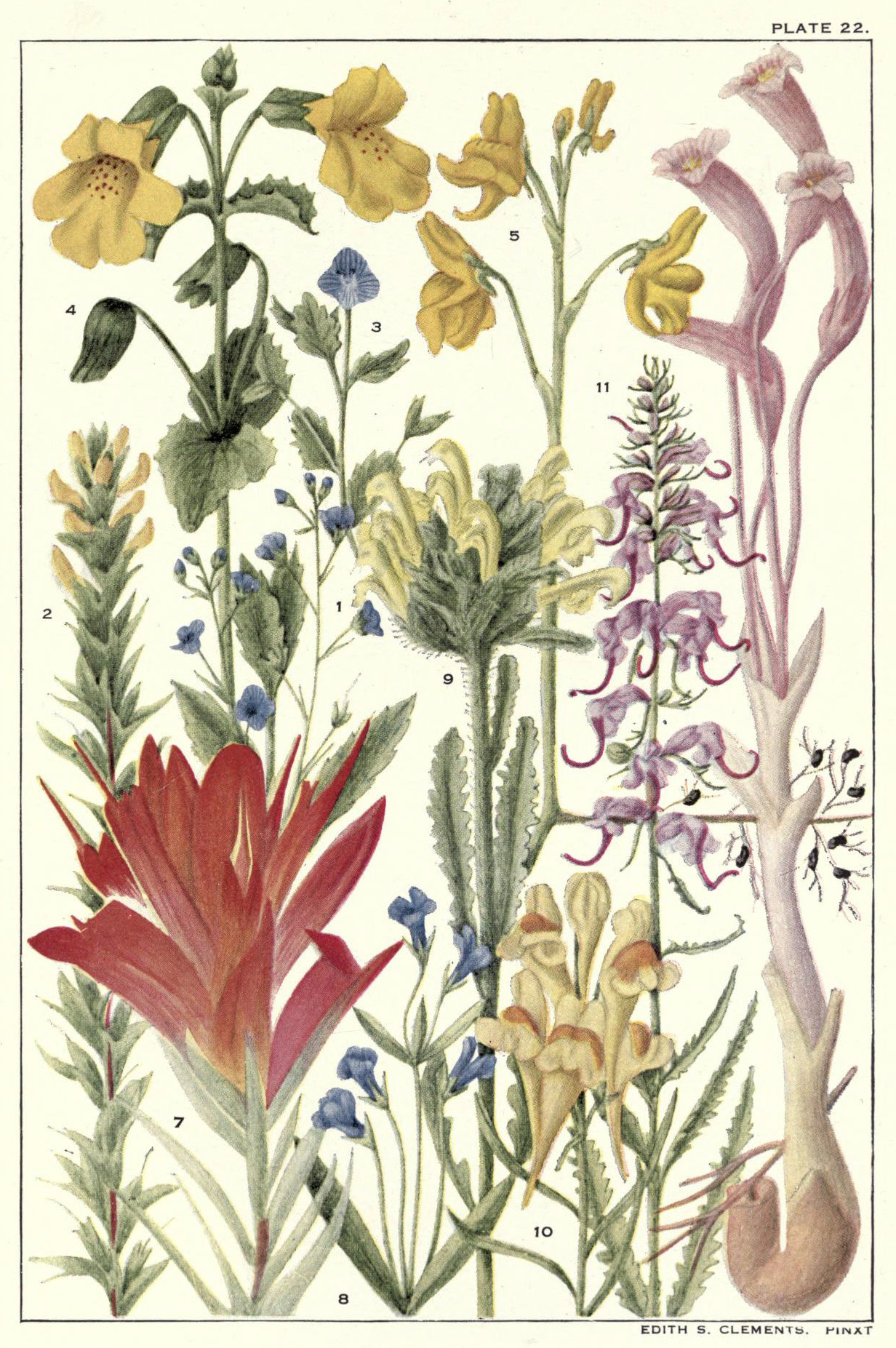
- Veronica americana Orthocarpus luteus Veronica buxbaumii Mimulus langsdorffii Utricularia vulgaris Thalesia uniflora Castilleja miniata Collinsia parviflora Pedicularis canadensis Linaria vulgaris Elephantella groenlandica

Scientific classification
- Kingdom: Plantae
- Clade: Embryophytes
- Clade: Tracheophytes
- Clade: Spermatophytes
- Clade: Angiosperms
- Clade: Eudicots
- Clade: Asterids
- Order: Lamiales
- Family: Plantaginaceae
- Genus: Veronica
- Species: V. pectinata

Binomial name
- Veronica pectinata L.

Synonyms
- Cochlidiosperma buxbaumii (F.W.Schmidt) Opiz; Veronica buxbaumii F.W.Schmidt; Veronica constantinopolitana Riek; Veronica pectinata var. glandulosa Riek ex M.A.Fisch.; Veronica pectinata var. villosa Bornm.; Veronica schizocalyx Freyn & Sint.

= Veronica pectinata =

Species of plant

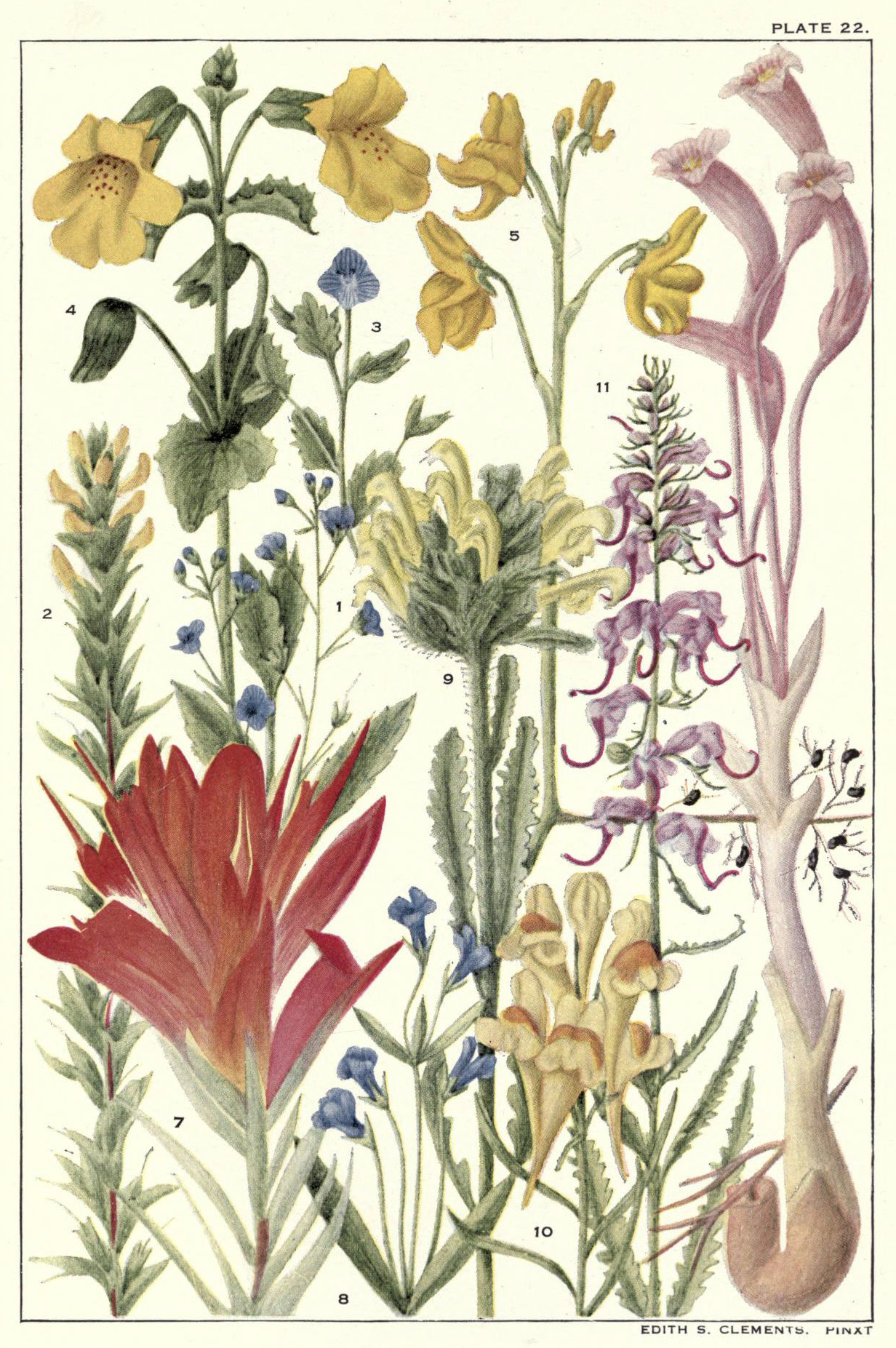
PLATE 22.: 1. Veronica americana; 2. Orthocarpus luteus; 3. Veronica buxbaumii = Veronica pectinata; 4. Mimulus langsdorffii; 5. Utricularia vulgaris; 6. Thalesia uniflora = Orobanche uniflora; 7. Castilleja miniata; 8. Collinsia parviflora; 9. Pedicularis canadensis; 10. Linaria vulgaris; 11. Elephantella groenlandica = Pedicularis groenlandica

Veronica pectinata, the scallop-leaved speedwell, is a species of flowering plant in the family Plantaginaceae. A perennial, it is native to Bulgaria, European Turkey, and Anatolia.

== Subtaxa ==
The following varieties are accepted:

- Veronica pectinata var. pectinata – entire range
- Veronica pectinata var. schizocalyx (Freyn & Sint.) Bornm. – northwestern and northern Anatolia
