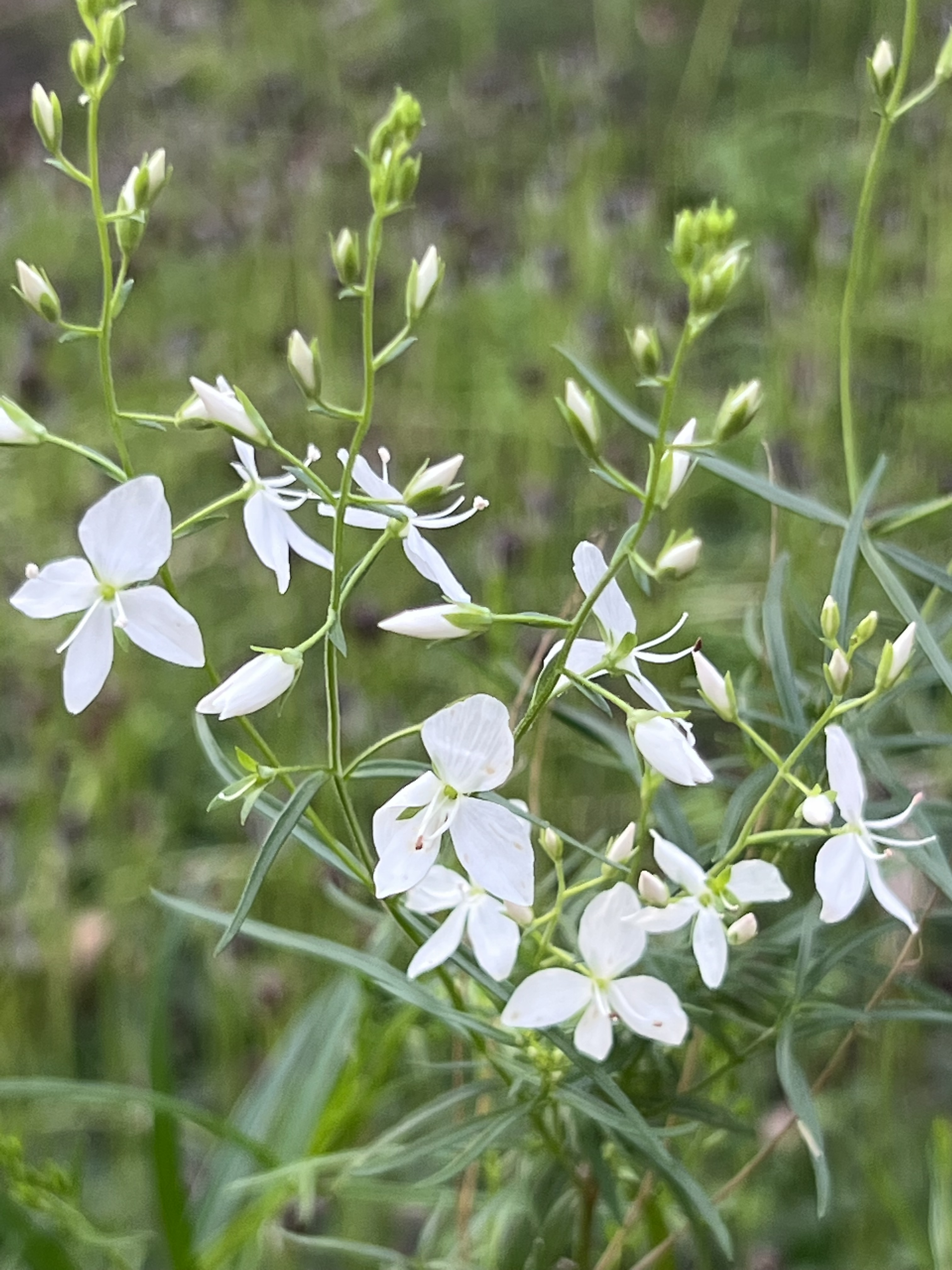

Scientific classification
- Kingdom: Plantae
- Clade: Tracheophytes
- Clade: Angiosperms
- Clade: Eudicots
- Clade: Asterids
- Order: Lamiales
- Family: Plantaginaceae
- Genus: Veronica
- Species: V. decorosa

Binomial name
- Veronica decorosa Muell.

= Veronica decorosa =

Species of flowering plant in the plantain family

Veronica decorosa is a flowering plant in the family Plantaginaceae and grows in South Australia. It has white flowers borne on long stems.

== Description ==
Veronica decorosa is a small shrub to 1 m (3 ft 3 in) high and similar width and mostly smooth. The leaves are sessile, linear to oval-linear shaped, 1–7.5 cm (0.39–2.95 in) long, 0.5–5 mm (0.020–0.197 in) wide and the margins entire or sparsely toothed and recurved. The flowers are in a long racemes, white, occasionally purple in the centre, four lobed, each lobe 5–8 mm (0.20–0.31 in) long, blunt or rounded, upper lobe wider with purple lines, bracts narrowly oval-shaped and 2–9 mm (0.079–0.354 in) long. Flowering occurs from July to November and the fruit is a broad-elliptic shaped capsule about 3 mm (0.12 in) long, 3.5 mm (0.14 in) wide and ribbed.

== Taxonomy and naming ==
Veronica decorosa was first formally described in 1853 and the description was published in Linnaea: ein Journal für die Botanik in ihrem ganzen Umfange, oder Beiträge zur Pflanzenkunde. The specific epithet (decorus) means "graceful".

== Distribution and habitat ==
This species grows sometimes on rocky situations, usually on moist and sheltered sites in the Flinders Ranges and south to near St Vincents Gulf.
