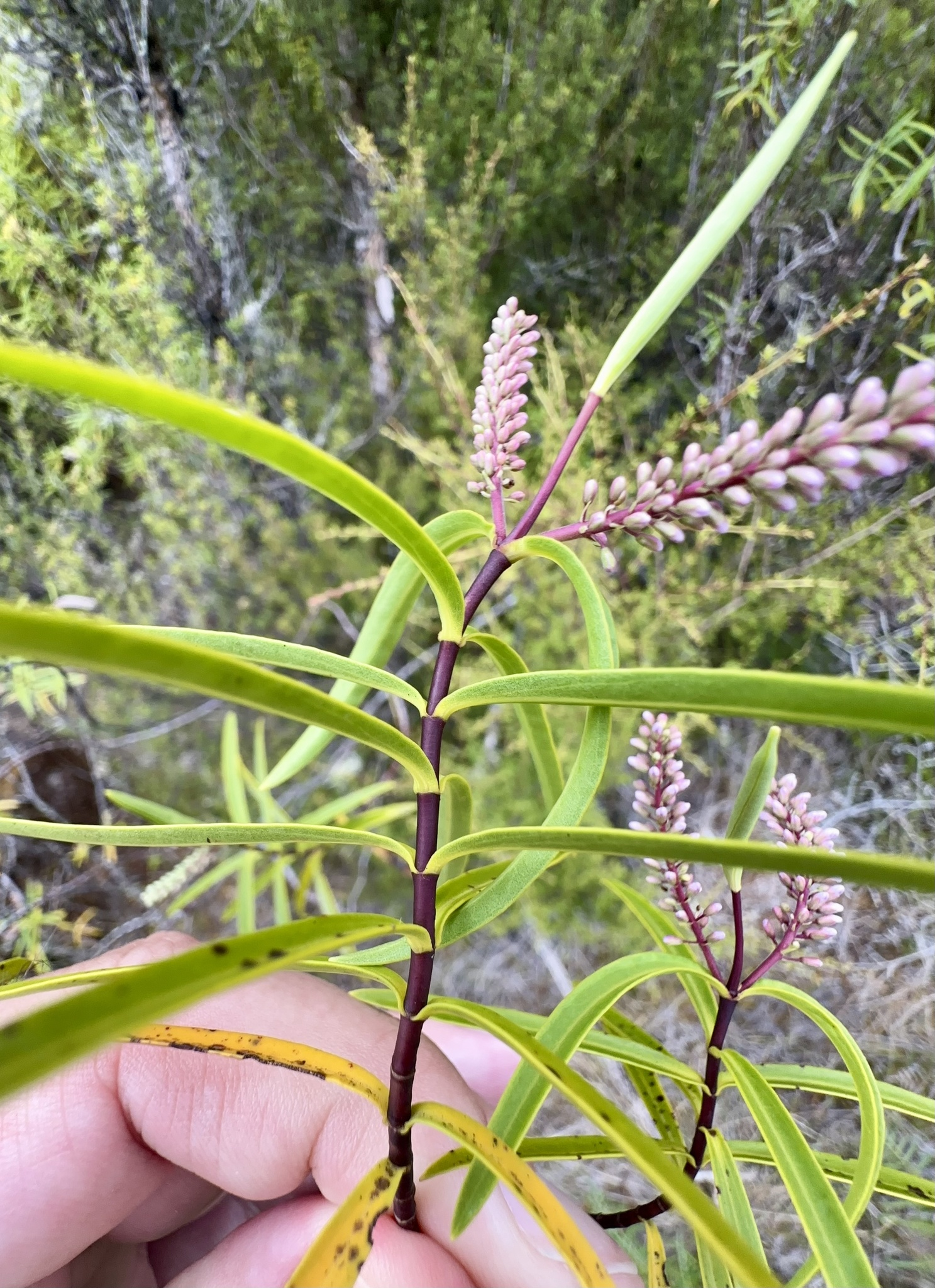
- V. stenophylla in Nelson Lakes National Park

Conservation status
- Not Threatened (NZ TCS)

Scientific classification
- Kingdom: Plantae
- Clade: Tracheophytes
- Clade: Angiosperms
- Clade: Eudicots
- Clade: Asterids
- Order: Lamiales
- Family: Plantaginaceae
- Genus: Veronica
- Species: V. stenophylla

Binomial name
- Veronica stenophylla Steud.

Subspecies
- V. s. var. hesperia; V. s. var. oliveri; V. s. var. stenophylla

Synonyms
- Hebe angustifolia; Hebe stenophylla; Veronica angustifolia; Veronica squalida

= Veronica stenophylla =

Plant species in the veronica family

Veronica stenophylla is a species of hebe or veronica, endemic to New Zealand. It has three varieties, two of which are considered as Naturally Uncommon. it can be very difficult to distinguish from other similar veronicas. It is found in both the North and South Island.

== Description ==
This species is a generally low bush, up to 2 m (6 ft 7 in) in height, which can at times be sprawling. The underside of the leaves are pitted, which is one of the main distinguishing features, but a loupe may be necessary to see these. The leaf margins are usually glabrous and smooth.

There are many features which can or must be used in sequence to determine this species from other similar species.

== Range and habitat ==
In the North Island, var. stenophylla is found from Auckland sparsely south to Taupo and the center of the North Island, and then more commonly down to the bottom of the North Island and at the top of the South Island. Var. oliveri is found only on Stephens Island in the Cook Strait.

This species is found in open areas where it is able to get sun, often in rocky areas such as near roads or streams.

== Etymology ==
Stenophylla comes from the Greek for "narrow leaf", referring to the narrow leaves, which are generally common in veronicas. The name is a Greek replacement for the Latin angustifolia, a junior synonym.

== Taxonomy ==
The botanist Ernst Gottlieb von Steudel described a species in 1841 which he named Veronica stenophylla. It is part of the genus Veronica which is classified in the Plantaginaceae family. It has three accepted varieties according to Plants of the World Online.

- Veronica stenophylla var. hesperia – This subspecies is Naturally Uncommon. It is found only in the northwest of the South Island.
- Veronica stenophylla var. oliveri – This subspecies is Naturally Uncommon, and only appears on Stephens Island in the Cook Strait, where it is found mostly on the western side on cliffs.
- Veronica stenophylla var. stenophylla – This subspecies is not considered At Risk, but is Not Threatened.

Veronica stenophylla has nine synonyms of the species or one of its three accepted varieties.

Table of Synonyms
Name	Year	Rank	Synonym of:	Notes
Hebe angustifolia (Hook.f.) Cockayne & Allan	1927	species	V. stenophylla	≡ hom., nom. superfl.
Hebe parviflora var. angustifolia (Hook.f.) L.B.Moore	1961	variety	V. stenophylla	≡ hom.
Hebe stenophylla (Steud.) Bayly & Garn.-Jones	2000	species	V. stenophylla	≡ hom.
Hebe stenophylla var. hesperia Bayly & Garn.-Jones	2000	variety	var. hesperia	≡ hom.
Hebe stenophylla var. oliveri Bayly & Garn.-Jones	2000	variety	var. oliveri	≡ hom.
Veronica angustifolia A.Rich.	1832	species	V. stenophylla	≡ hom., nom. illeg., homonym. post.
Veronica angustifolia var. abbreviata Petrie	1921	variety	V. stenophylla	= het.
Veronica parviflora var. angustifolia Hook.f.	1872	variety	V. stenophylla	≡ hom.
Veronica squalida Kirk	1895	species	var. stenophylla	= het.
Notes: ≡ homotypic synonym; = heterotypic synonym
