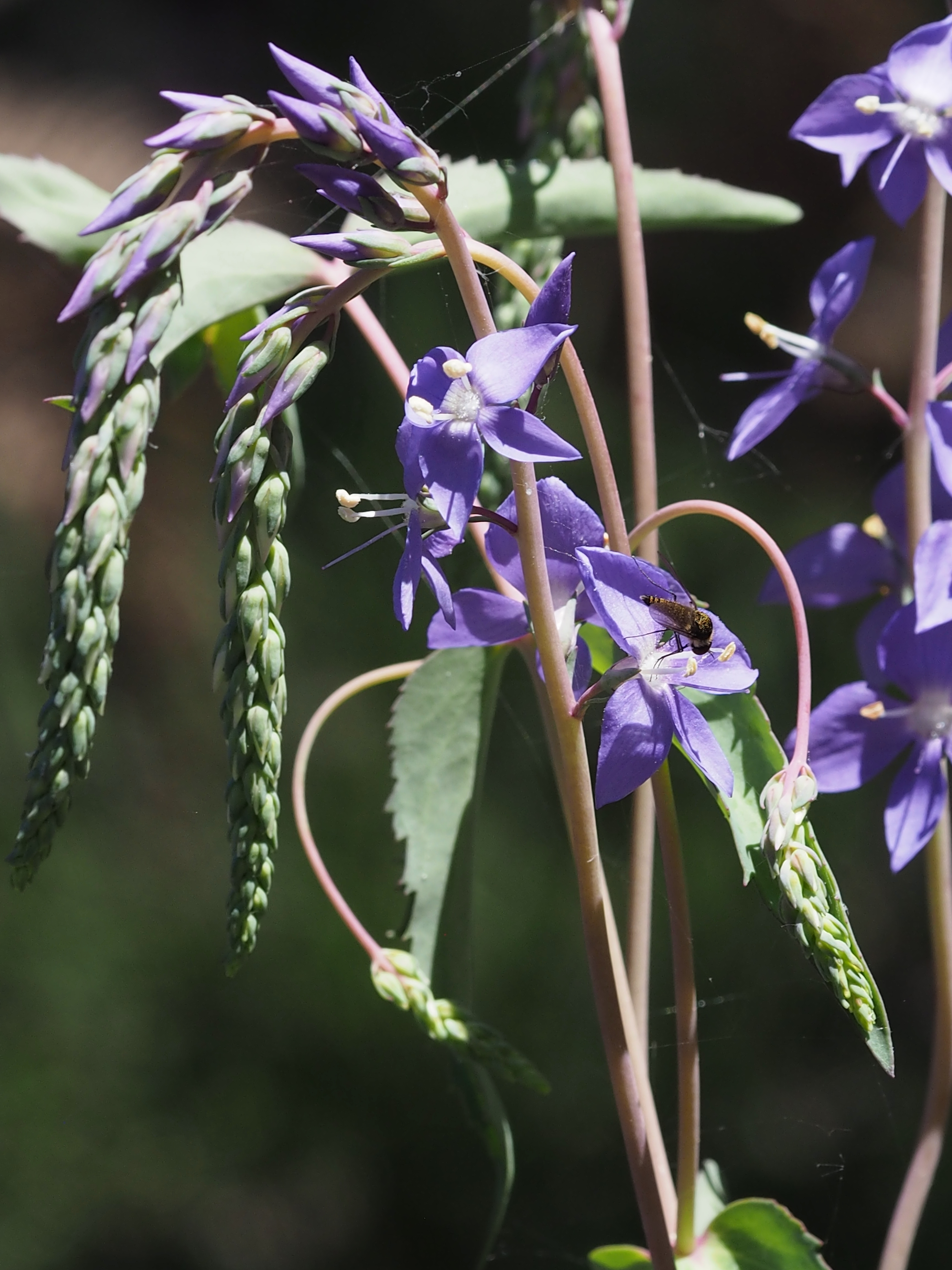
- Veronica arcuata near Ebor

Scientific classification
- Kingdom: Plantae
- Clade: Embryophytes
- Clade: Tracheophytes
- Clade: Spermatophytes
- Clade: Angiosperms
- Clade: Eudicots
- Clade: Asterids
- Order: Lamiales
- Family: Plantaginaceae
- Genus: Veronica
- Species: V. arcuata

Binomial name
- Veronica arcuata (B.G.Briggs & Ehrend.) B.G.Briggs

Synonyms
- Derwentia arcuata B.G.Briggs & Ehrend.; Parahebe arcuata (B.G.Briggs & Ehrend.) Heads

= Veronica arcuata =

Species of flowering plant

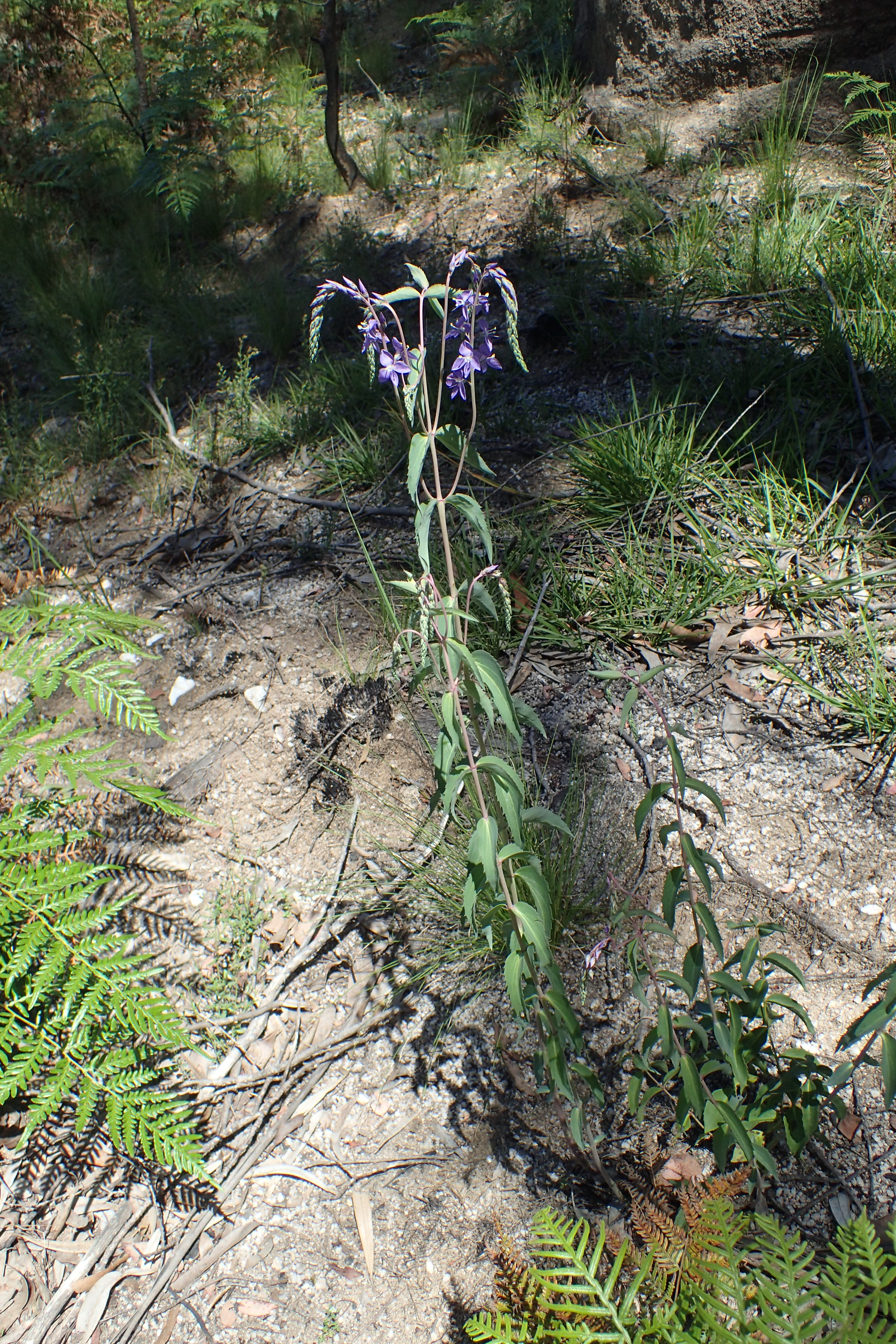
Habit

Veronica arcuata is a flowering plant species in the family Plantaginaceae. It is native to northern New South Wales. The lilac coloured flowers are showy and conspicuous from late spring to late summer.

== Description ==
Veronica arcuata is a perennial herb or small shrub growing up to 70 cm (30 in) high. Several stems grow at ground level from a slender woody rootstock or underground rhizome. The stems are mostly erect and rarely branched below the inflorescence. They are smooth, bluish-green and covered with a powdery film. The leaves are arranged in opposite pairs, narrowly egg-shaped and may be coarsely toothed with 6-15 pairs along the leaf blade. The leaves have no stalk, curve downward and are 3.2–9 cm (1–4 in) long and 10–45 mm (0.4–2 in) wide. The leaves mostly have about seven longitudinal veins and end in a sharp point. The inflorescences grow at the end of each stem. The raceme may be 9–35 cm (4–10 in) long, bearing 20-85 individual lilac coloured flowers. The sepals are 4–5 mm (0.16–0.20 in) long and 0.8–1.2 mm (0.031–0.047 in) wide. The seed capsules are egg-shaped, 5–9.5 mm (0.2–0.4 in) long, 3–5 mm (0.1–0.2 in) wide and slightly flattened. The seeds are smooth, bluish-green with a powdery film, the apex either obtuse or square. The sepals remain after flowering and are 0.8–1.2 mm (0.03–0.05 in) wide, encircling the fruit.

== Taxonomy and naming ==
This species was first formally described in 1992 by Barbara Briggs and Friedrich Ehrendorfer who gave it the name Derwentia arcuata and published the description in Telopea. In 2007 Briggs changed the name to Veronica arcuata and published the change in the journal "Taxon". The specific epithet (arcuata) is derived from the Latin arcuatus meaning "bent like a bow", referring to the recurved leaves.

== Distribution and habitat ==
Veronica arcuata is found at higher altitudes in northern New South Wales from Deepwater to Walcha where it grows in shallow soil over granite and basalt in eucalypt woodland.
