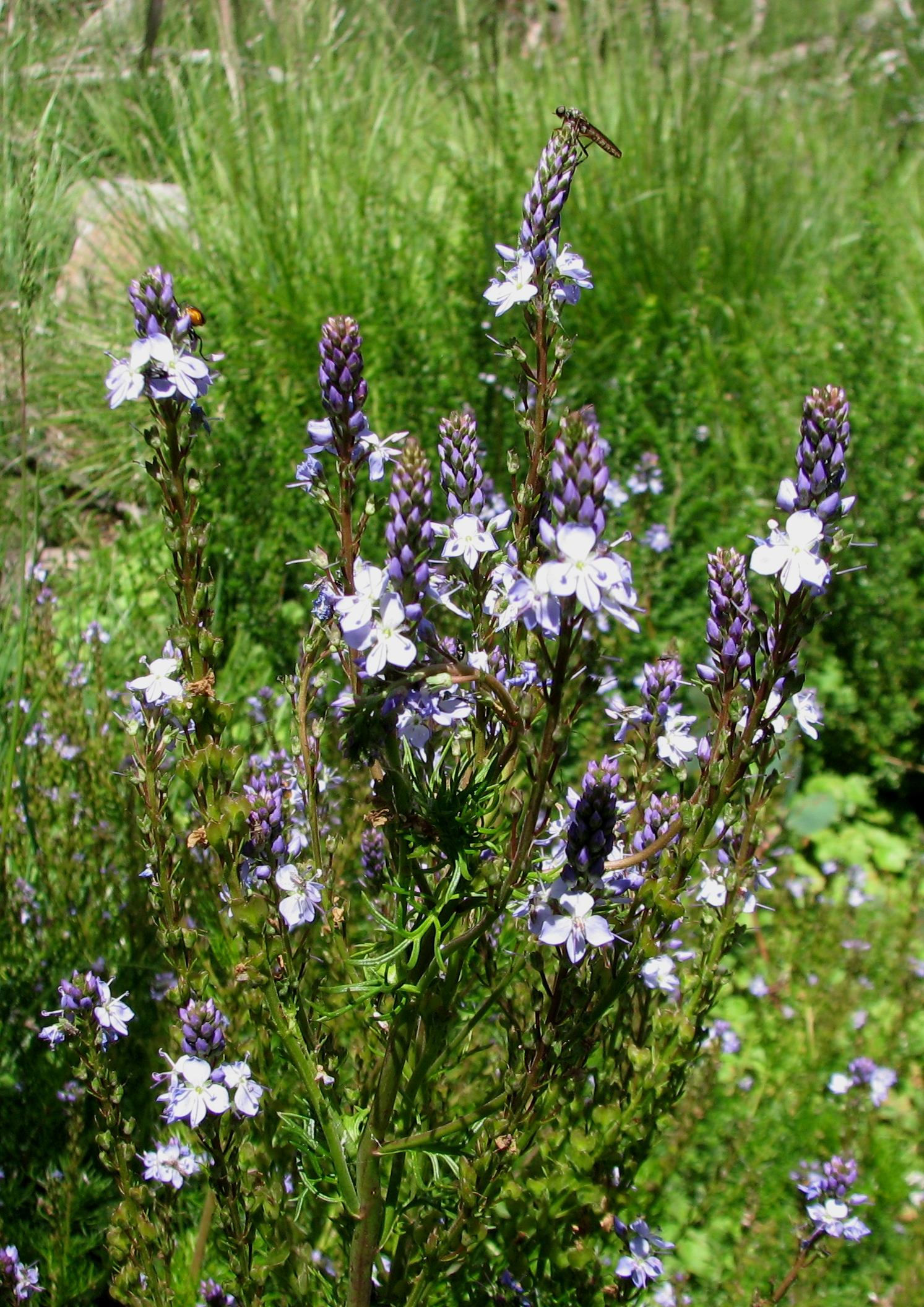
- Veronica nivea Lake Mountain, Victoria

Scientific classification
- Kingdom: Plantae
- Clade: Embryophytes
- Clade: Tracheophytes
- Clade: Spermatophytes
- Clade: Angiosperms
- Clade: Eudicots
- Clade: Asterids
- Order: Lamiales
- Family: Plantaginaceae
- Genus: Veronica
- Species: V. nivea

Binomial name
- Veronica nivea Lindl.

Synonyms
- Derwentia nivea (Lindl.) B.G.Briggs & Ehrend.; Parahebe nivea (Lindl.) Heads

= Veronica nivea =

Species of flowering plant

Veronica nivea, the milfoil speedwell or snow speedwell, is a flowering plant species of the family Plantaginaceae, endemic to south-eastern Australia. It is sometimes included in the genus Parahebe or Derwentia.

It is a subshrub which grows to between 15 and 50 cm (5.9 and 20 in) high. The pinnately divided leaves are 1.5 to 3 cm long. The flowers are white, pale lilac or bright blue and appear in racemes of 20 to 40 in summer.

The species occurs in alpine and subalpine grassland, heathland and woodland in New South Wales, Victoria and Tasmania. In New South Wales it is recorded in Kosciuszko National Park while in Victoria it is known from the Baw Baw plateau as well as areas including Mount Buffalo, Lake Mountain and Falls Creek. It is often found on disturbed sites.

The Latin specific epithet nivea means "white as snow".
