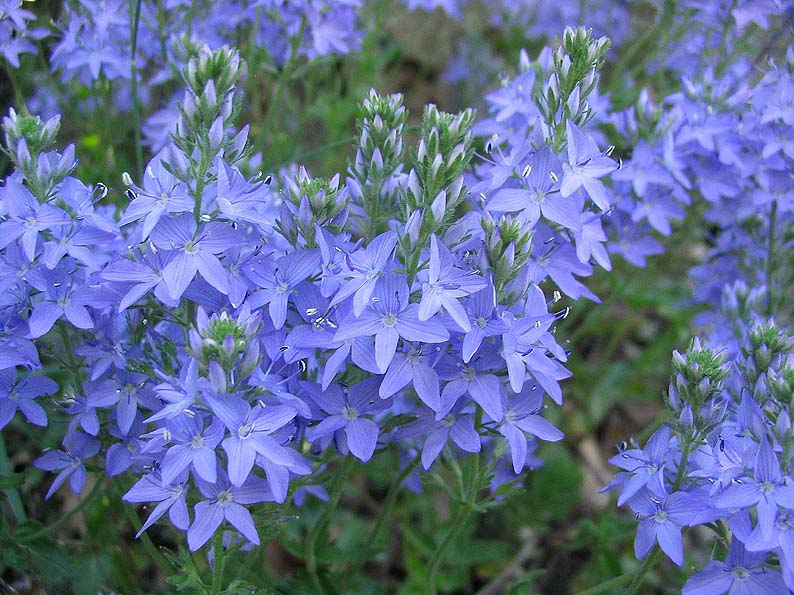

Conservation status
- Secure (NatureServe)

Scientific classification
- Kingdom: Plantae
- Clade: Embryophytes
- Clade: Tracheophytes
- Clade: Spermatophytes
- Clade: Angiosperms
- Clade: Eudicots
- Clade: Asterids
- Order: Lamiales
- Family: Plantaginaceae
- Genus: Veronica
- Species: V. austriaca

Binomial name
- Veronica austriaca L.

= Veronica austriaca =

Species of flowering plant

Veronica austriaca, the broadleaf speedwell, large speedwell, Austrian speedwell, or saw-leaved speedwell, is a species of flowering plant in the plantain family Plantaginaceae, native to northern temperate Europe. Growing to 90 cm (35 in) tall by 60 cm (24 in) broad, it is a mound-forming herbaceous perennial, with deeply toothed leaves and erect spikes of bright blue flowers throughout summer.

The specific epithet austriaca refers to Austria within its native range.

Several cultivars are available, of which the following have gained the Royal Horticultural Society's Award of Garden Merit:-

- V. austriaca subsp. teucrium 'Crater Lake Blue'
- V. austriaca subsp. teucrium 'Royal Blue'
