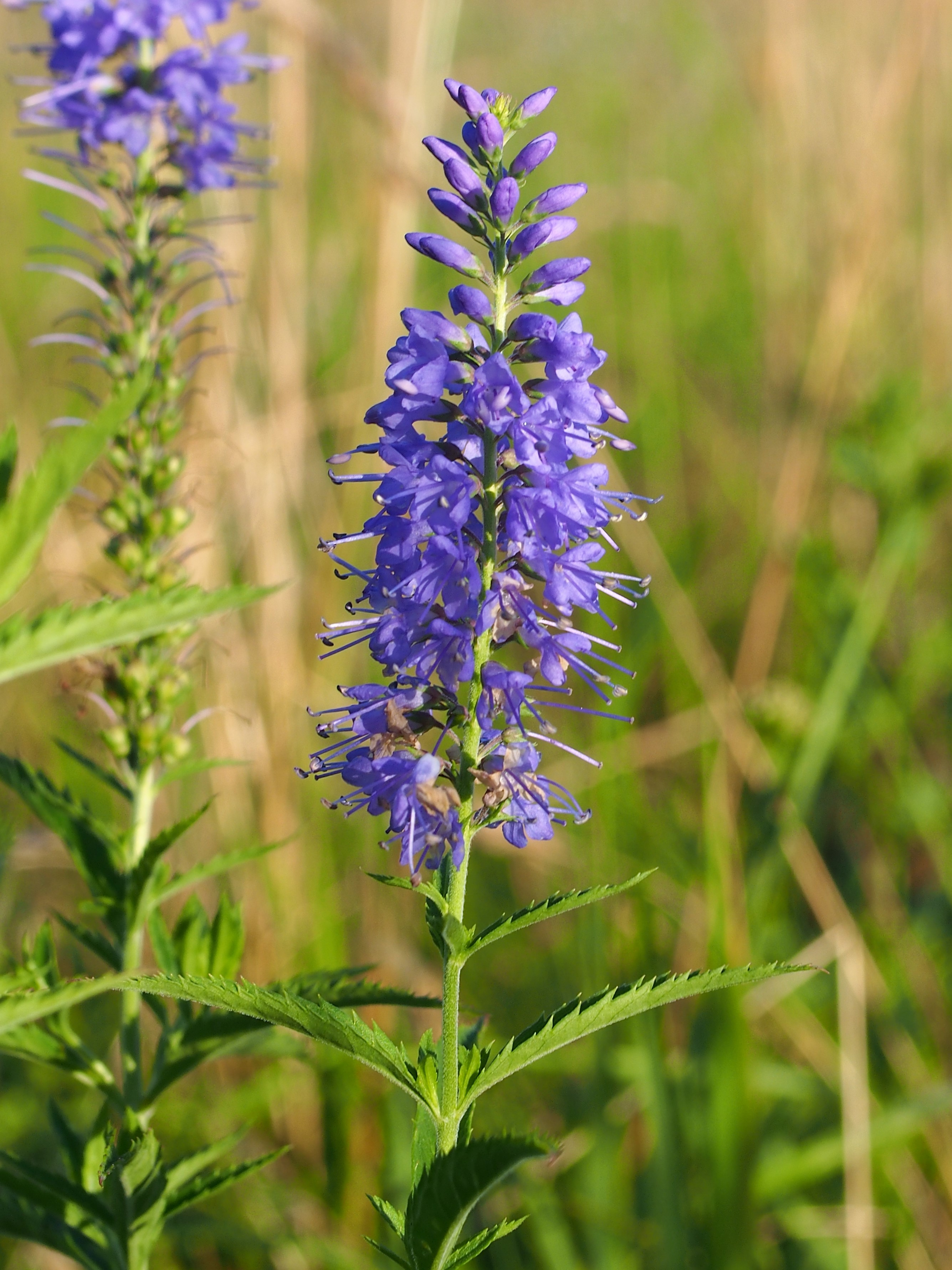

Scientific classification
- Kingdom: Plantae
- Clade: Tracheophytes
- Clade: Angiosperms
- Clade: Eudicots
- Clade: Asterids
- Order: Lamiales
- Family: Plantaginaceae
- Genus: Veronica
- Species: V. longifolia

Binomial name
- Veronica longifolia L.

Synonyms
- Pseudolysimachion longifolium

= Veronica longifolia =

Species of flowering plant

Veronica longifolia, known as garden speedwell or longleaf speedwell, is a flowering plant in the family Plantaginaceae where many introduced varieties in North America are native to Europe and Western Asia.

== Description ==
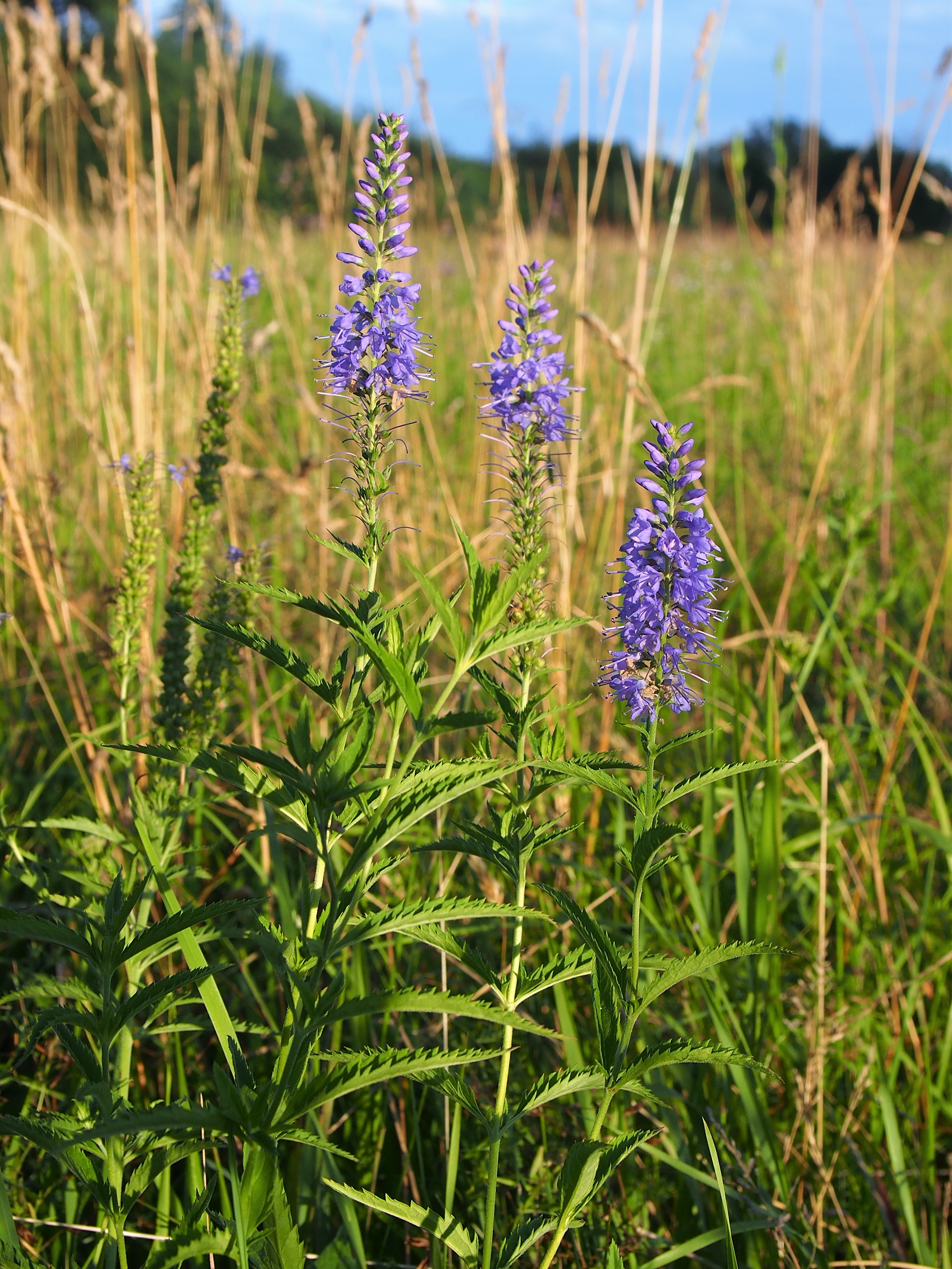
Full view of plant in bloom.

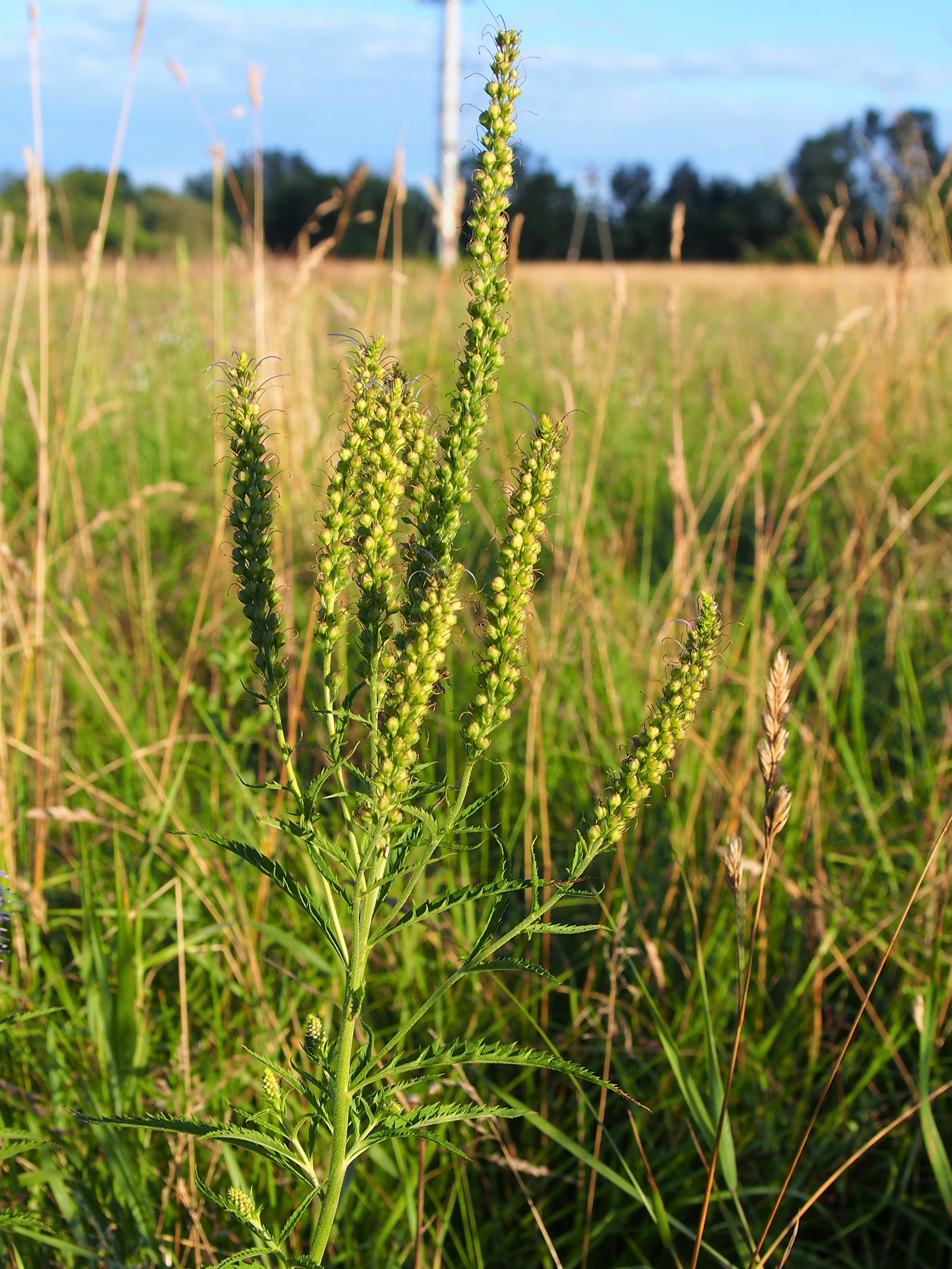
Seed pods after flowering period.

This herbaceous perennial is 60–120 cm (2–4 ft) tall and spreads to 60 cm (2 ft). The flower spikes are 25–30 cm (10–12 in) long and bear lilac to purple blooms. The foliage is lance-shaped with dark green leaves that are arranged oppositely along the stem.
