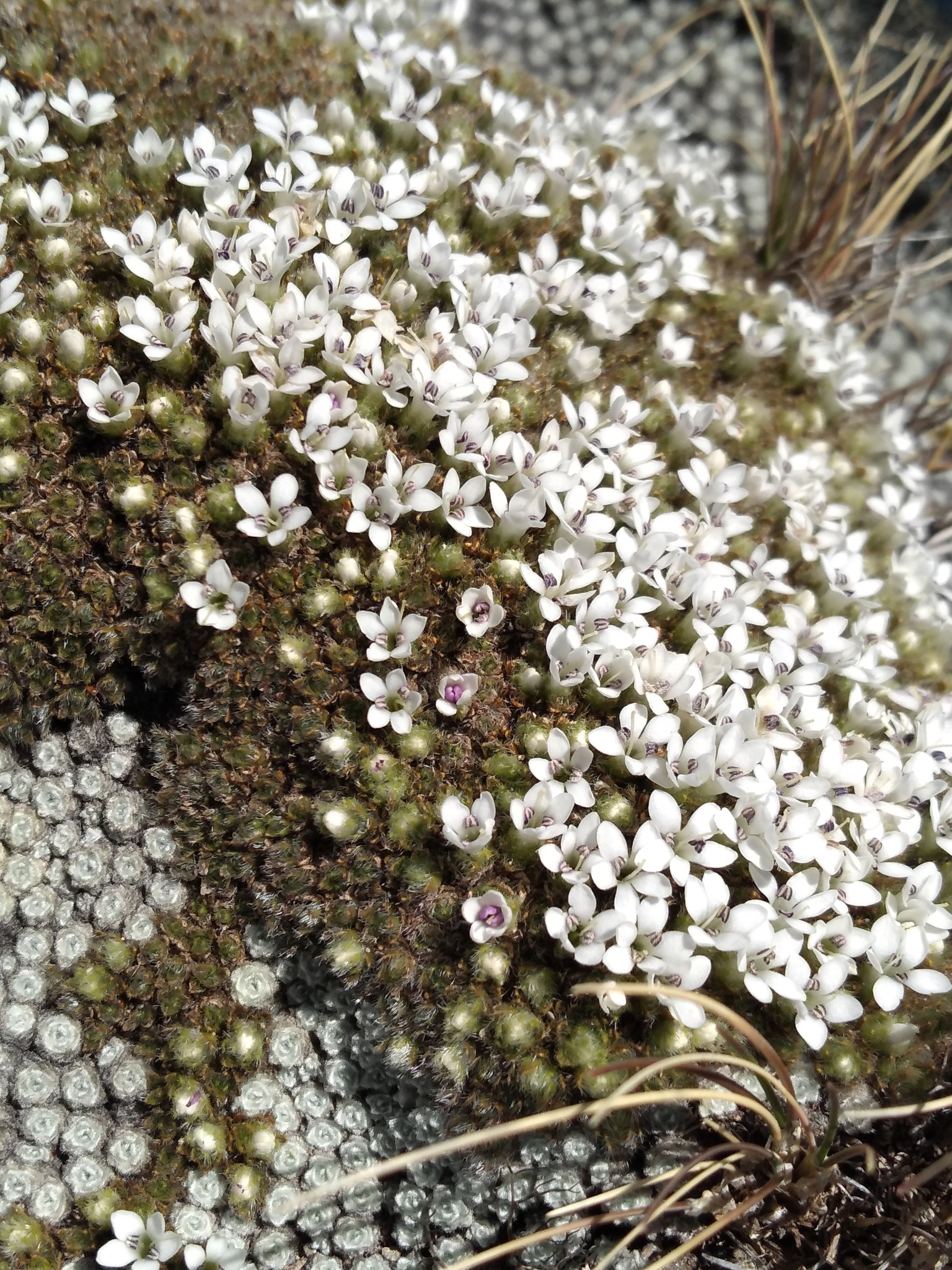
- Flowering Veronica pulvinaris cushion

Conservation status
- Not Threatened (NZ TCS)

Scientific classification
- Kingdom: Plantae
- Clade: Tracheophytes
- Clade: Angiosperms
- Clade: Eudicots
- Clade: Asterids
- Order: Lamiales
- Family: Plantaginaceae
- Genus: Veronica
- Species: V. pulvinaris

Binomial name
- Veronica pulvinaris Garn.-Jones

Synonyms
- Pygmea pulvinaris Hook.f.; Chionohebe pulvinaris (Hook.f.)B.G.Briggs & Ehrend.; Pygmea ciliolata var. pumila Ashwin; Veronica ciliolata var. pumila (Ashwin) Garn.-Jones

= Veronica pulvinaris =

Species of plant

Veronica pulvinaris, one of the cushion snow hebes, is a species of flowering plant in the family Plantaginaceae. It is endemic to high elevation habitats in the mountains of the northern and central South Island of New Zealand, mostly east of the main divide. Joseph Dalton Hooker described Pygmea pulvinaris in 1864, which was transferred to the genus Veronica in 1906 by Thomas Cheeseman. Plants of this species are dioecious cushions with small, spirally overlapping, sessile leaves that have sparsely but evenly distributed hairs mostly on the upper half of the leaf surfaces and edges. They also have radially symmetrical flowers with the five petals fused into white tubular corollas, two stamens, and both the ovary and the fruit (capsule) have a dense covering of hairs at the apex. Seeds of this species are dispersed by the "splash cup" method or hygrochasy, when falling raindrops splash the seeds out of the open capsule. The conservation status of V. pulvinaris is Not Threatened under the New Zealand Threat Classification System. It is closely related to other snow hebe species, especially the other cushions, V. thomsonii, V. chionohebe and V. ciliolata.

== Description ==
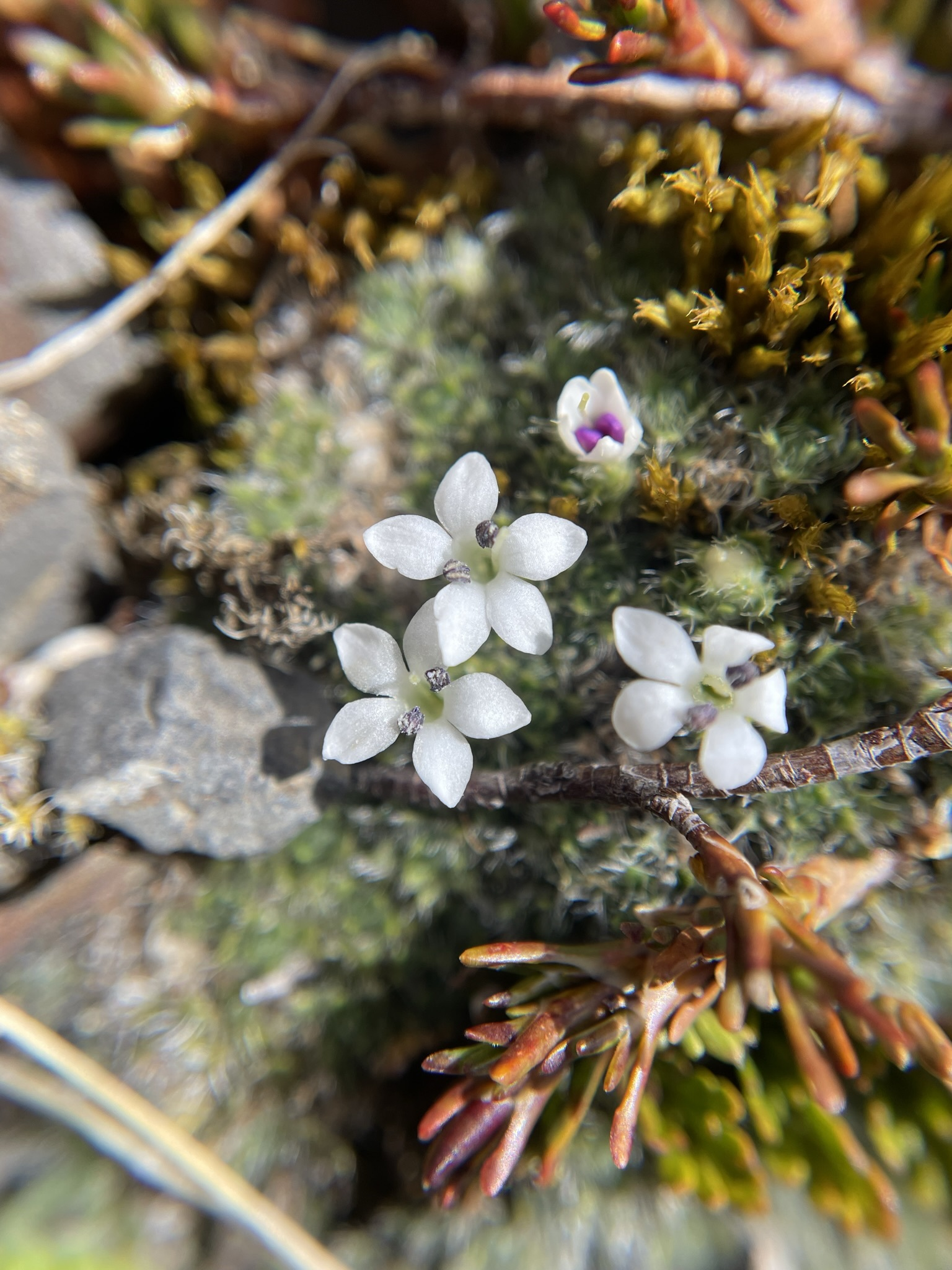
Close-up of flowers

Veronica pulvinaris plants are perennial cushions with a woody base. Branches are multiple, erect, up to 39 mm long and 4.6 mm wide, and glabrous (hairless). Leaves are spirally overlapping (imbricate), tightly or loosely appressed and sessile. They are 1.8–4.9 mm long by 0.6–1.8 mm wide (length: width ratio 1.7–5.3:1), usually widest above the middle with a rounded (obtuse) apex (oblanceolate, narrowly obovate or spathulate), with smooth (entire) edges. The leaf hairs are unicellular, non-glandular and with a pointed tip, appressed and up to 1.4 mm long. The inner leaf surface is usually sparsely hairy (or with just a few hairs only) on the upper half, or rarely glabrous. The outer leaf surface is usually glabrous to sparsely hairy on the upper half only. Leaf edges are fringed with hairs (ciliate) mostly on the upper half.

Flowers are sessile, solitary and located in the axils (in the angle between the leaf and the stem) near branch tips, each with two modified leaves called bracts. Bracts are 2.2–4.1 mm long and 0.3–0.8 mm wide with an obtuse apex and hairs similar to the leaves but shorter (0.3–0.8 mm long). The calyx (the collective term for the fused sepals) is 2.1–4.7 mm long, radially symmetrical (with so-called regular flower symmetry), with all sepal lobes divided to the base of the calyx, hairy on the outside and lobe edges and glabrous on the inside. The corolla (the collective term for the fused petals) is 2.6–7.7 mm long (including a 1.6–5.8 mm long corolla tube), subregular and white. The corolla lobes are 1.0–2.4 mm long, spreading to erect, narrowly to very broadly obovate. There are two stamens (the male reproductive part of the flower), composed of white filaments 0.2–0.8 mm long and anthers (purple in male flowers) 0.5–1.4 mm long. The style is 2.3–7.0 mm long, longer than the corolla (exserted), with a rounded, head-like (capitate) stigma. The ovary is 0.5–1.1 mm long and densely hairy at the tip with hairs up to 0.4 mm long.

Fruits are capsules which split open along two perpendicular lines of both the locule walls and the cavities (i.e. having both septicidal and loculicidal dehiscence), 1.0–3.0 mm long and 1.2–2.7 mm wide, hairy at the tip. There are up to 11 seeds in each capsule, and seeds are 0.5–0.9 mm long and 0.4–0.6 mm wide, disc-shaped, and smooth. Veronica pulvinaris has a diploid chromosome number of 42.

== Taxonomy ==
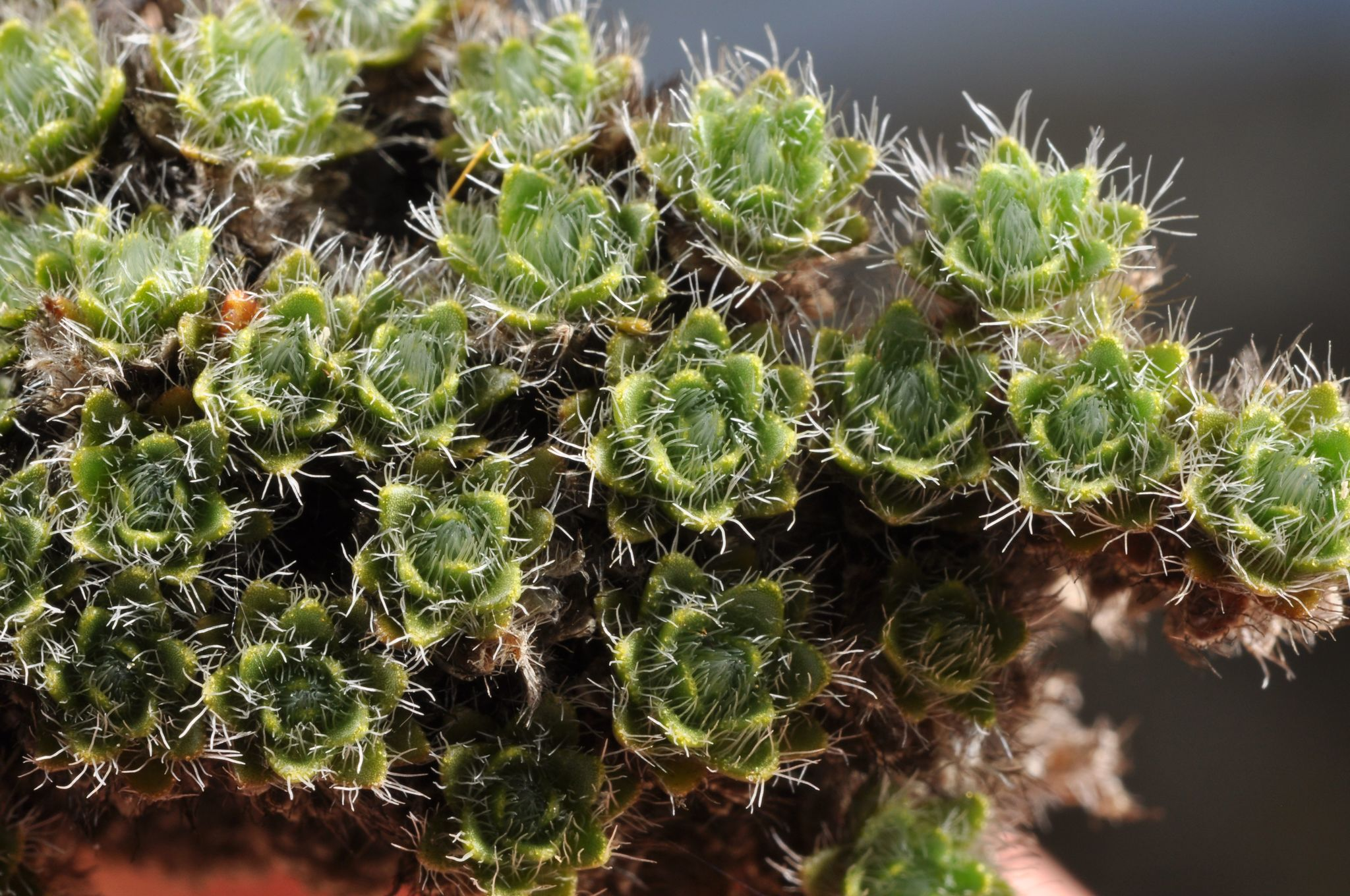
Close-up showing leaf hairs

Veronica pulvinaris is in the family Plantaginaceae. British botanist Joseph Dalton Hooker described Pygmea pulvinaris in Volume I of his Handbook of the New Zealand Flora in 1864. The species was transferred to the genus Veronica in 1906 by New Zealand botanist Thomas Cheeseman. Australian botanist Barbara Briggs and Austrian botanist Friedrich Ehrendorfer treated the species as Chionohebe pulvinaris in 1976, but since 2007 it has been recognised as Veronica pulvinaris by many botanists in a more broadly circumscribed Veronica.

The type specimen associated with the naming of Pygmea pulvinaris was collected on the summit of Mount Torlesse, Canterbury, by German-New Zealand geologist and botanical collector Julius von Haast in 1860–1. The holotype is at the herbarium at Royal Botanical Gardens Kew.

Veronica pulvinaris is one of four cushion plants and six other small herbaceous plants or subshrubs in the snow hebe lineage. The distribution and location of hairs are important characters in distinguishing V. pulvinaris from other snow hebe species. Veronica pulvinaris is characterised by the tips of its ovary and fruit (a capsule) having densely distributed hairs, as well as the leaf surfaces and edges having evenly and sparsely distributed hairs on the upper half.

== Phylogeny ==
Many New Zealand species of Veronica have been investigated in multiple phylogenetic analyses, including Veronica pulvinaris and other snow hebes, to improve understanding of the phylogenetic history of the genus. These studies have analysed multiple types of data, including morphological data and standard DNA sequencing markers such as the internal transcribed spacer region (ITS), chloroplast DNA, nuclear low-copy DNA, transcriptomics and phylogenomics. Broadly speaking, these studies included one or few individuals of V. pulvinaris and the other snow hebe species, showing that they are highly supported within the southern hemisphere lineage of Veronica. In addition, V. pulvinaris is most closely related to the other cushion snow hebe species, V. thomsonii, V. chionohebe and V. ciliolata, followed by a sub-shrub snow hebe, V. densifolia, and sometimes also one or more of the remaining snow hebes that have been sampled in phylogenetic studies, including V. trifida, V. planopetiolata, or V. spectabilis.

Another study that sampled multiple individuals and populations used chloroplast DNA and amplified fragment length polymorphisms (AFLP) to understand the phylogeography, species relationships and phylogeny of the snow hebes as a group. Veronica pulvinaris was highly supported as monophyletic based on AFLP data, and there was geographic structuring within the species. The chloroplast data, on the other had, showed widespread chloroplast haplotype sharing among the cushion snow hebes V. pulvinaris, V. thomsonii, V. chionohebe and V. ciliolata, which is the result of incomplete lineage sorting and past hybridisation among species.

== Distribution and habitat ==
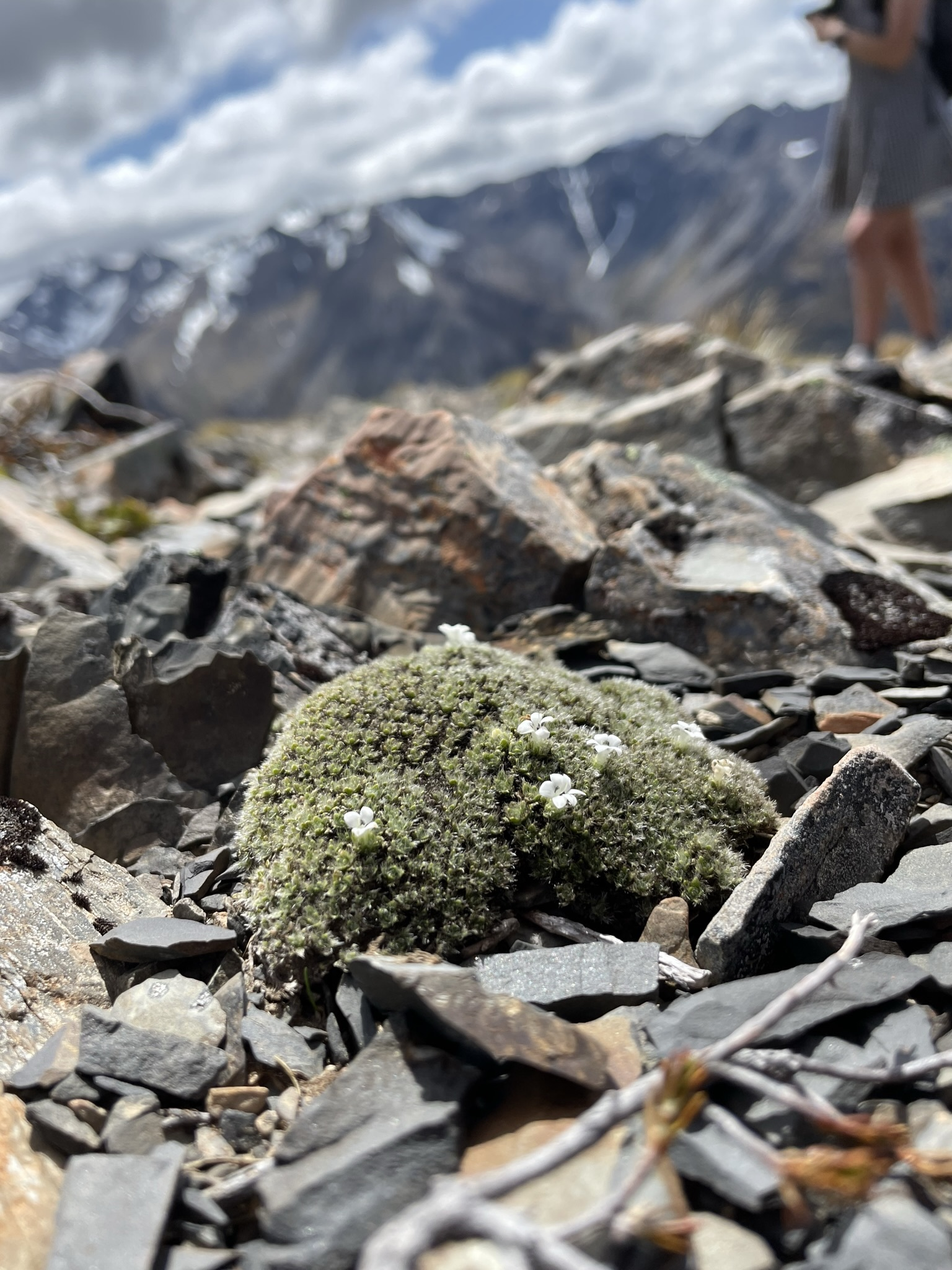
Flowering V. pulvinaris cushion in a rocky alpine habitat near Arthur's Pass, New Zealand

Veronica pulvinaris is endemic to the South Island of New Zealand, including northwest Nelson, Marlborough, Canterbury and possibly Otago, mostly on the eastern side of the main divide. Plants of this species can be found from 600 to 2260 m above sea level in alpine cushion herbfield or fellfield, usually in rocky areas including bluffs, crevices, stones and scree.

== Breeding system and seed dispersal ==
Veronica pulvinaris flowers from November to February and fruits mainly in December and January.

Like all other cushion snow hebes, Veronica pulvinaris is functionally gender dimorphic (dioecious or possibly gynodioecious). This means individual plants are either male or female, and outcrossing between plants is required to produce seed. The flowers are pollinated by insects.

Regarding seed dispersal, V. pulvinaris uses hygrochasy, which is also known as the "splash cup" method. In this process, the fruiting capsule opens upon exposure to water, and then falling raindrops splash the seeds out of the open capsule.

== Biochemistry ==
The water-soluble compounds that were isolated and identified from V. pulvinaris and another snow hebe species, V. thomsonii, showed that the iridoid chemical profile of these species was different from other New Zealand Veronica species, and more similar to high-elevation species of Veronica from the northern hemisphere. The authors of that study hypothesized that the similar chemical profiles were the result of convergent or parallel evolution due to their similar alpine habitats. In addition, there were some unique compounds that could differentiate V. pulvinaris and V. thomsonii from one another, as well as the two sampled populations of V. pulvinaris from the Black Birch Range (Marlborough) and Mt Arthur (Nelson). For example, V. pulvinaris plants contain the iridoids mussaenoside and veronicoside, which were not found in the V. thomsonii plants. Within V. pulvinaris, the Mt Arthur plants contained the iridoid minecoside, whereas the Black Birch Range plants had lagotoside and persicoside.

== Conservation status ==
According to the most recent (2023) New Zealand Threat Classification System (NZTCS), Veronica pulvinaris is considered to be Not Threatened. Its status was unchanged from the 2012 assessment (as Chionohebe pulvinaris) and the 2017 assessment.

== Gallery ==
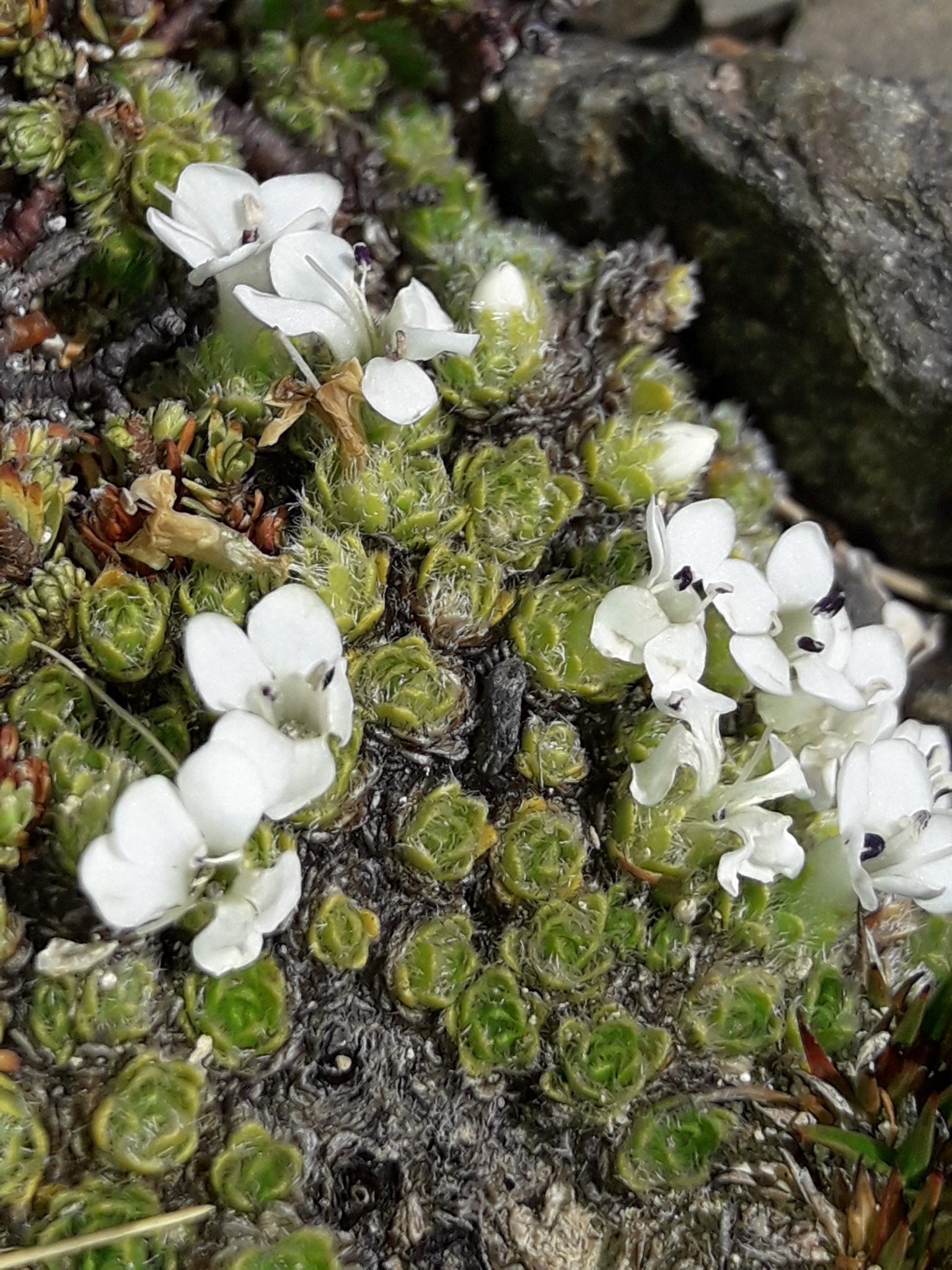
Flowers and leaves

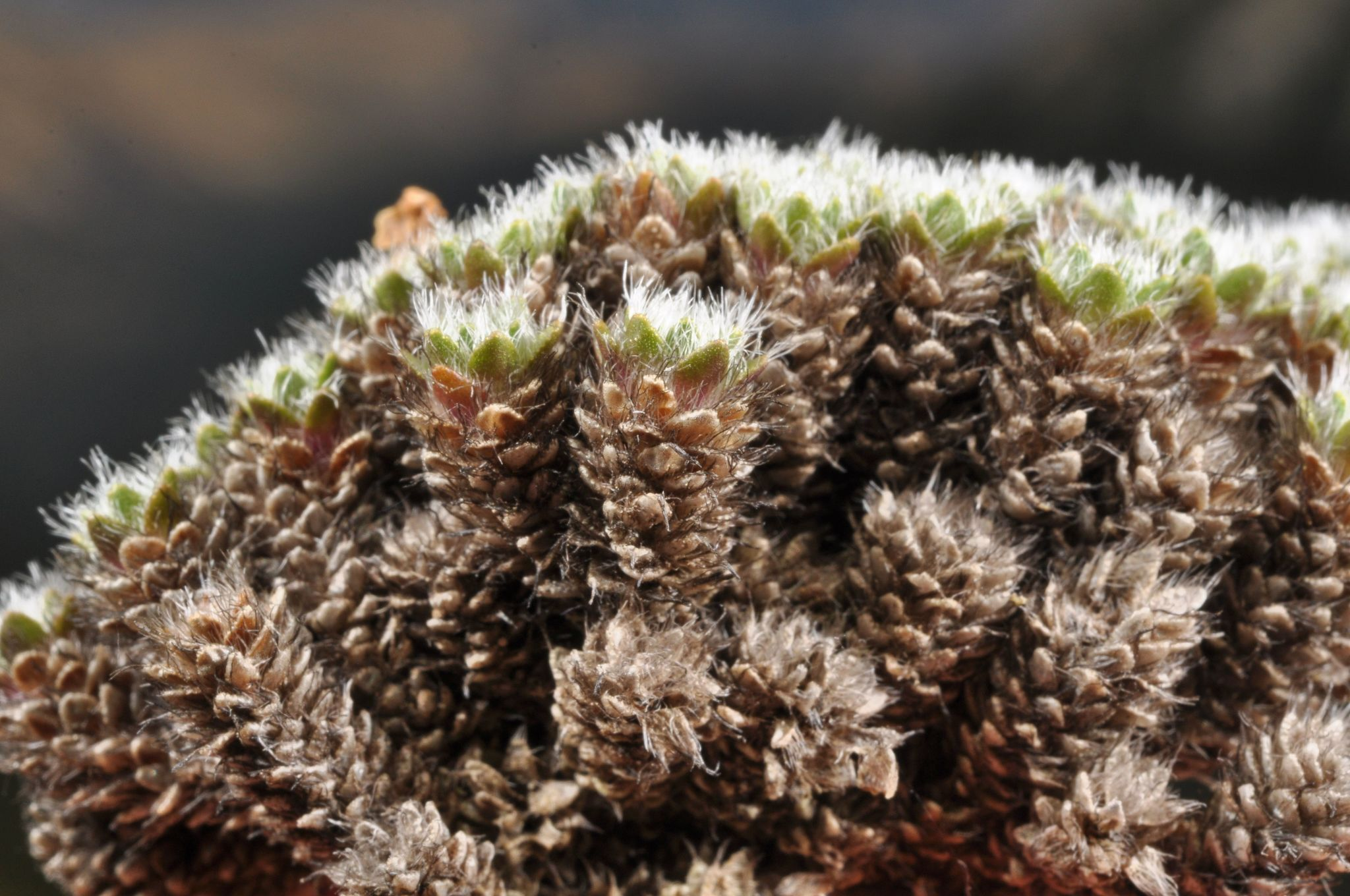
Side view of cushion showing imbricate leaves

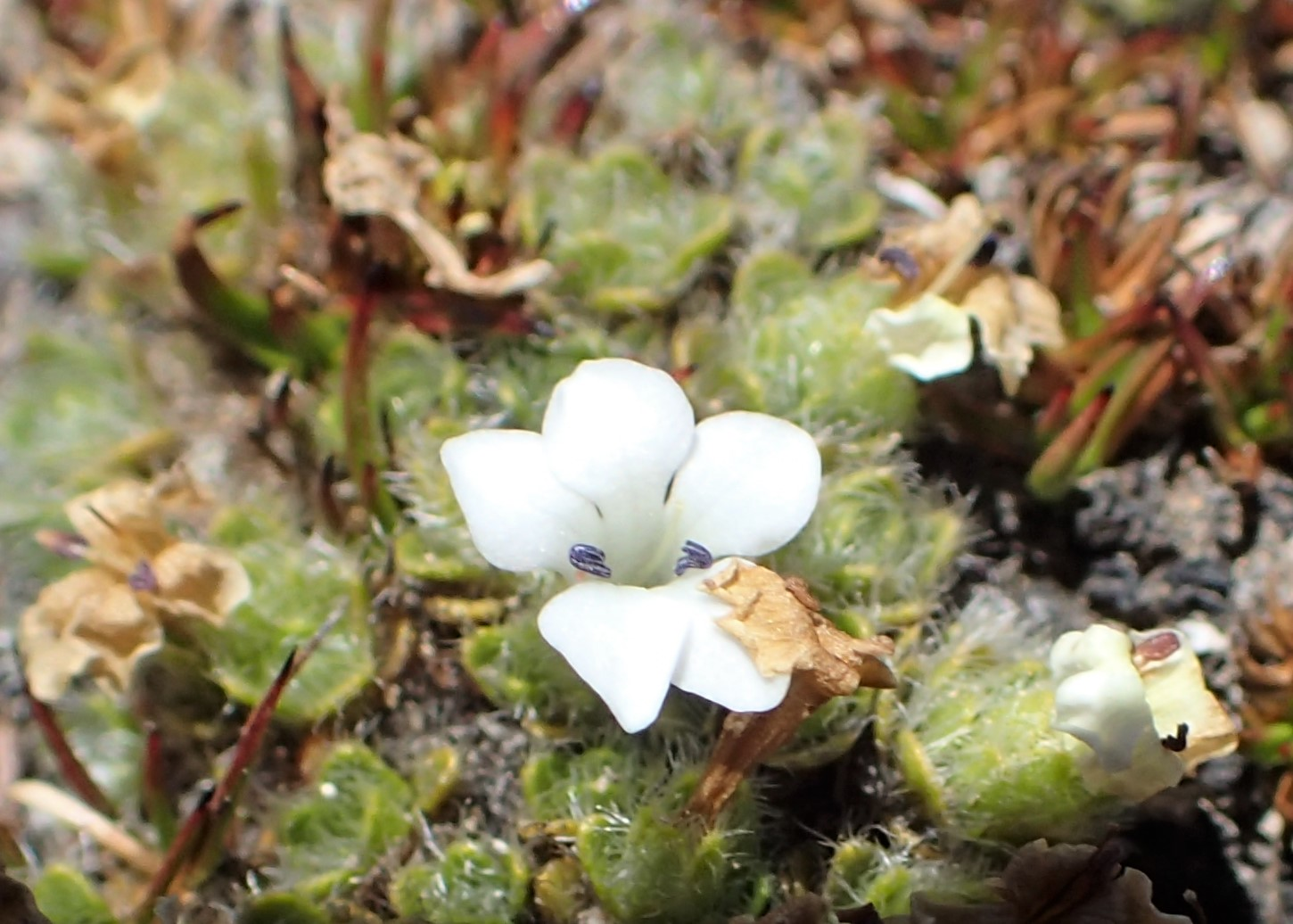
Close-up of flower

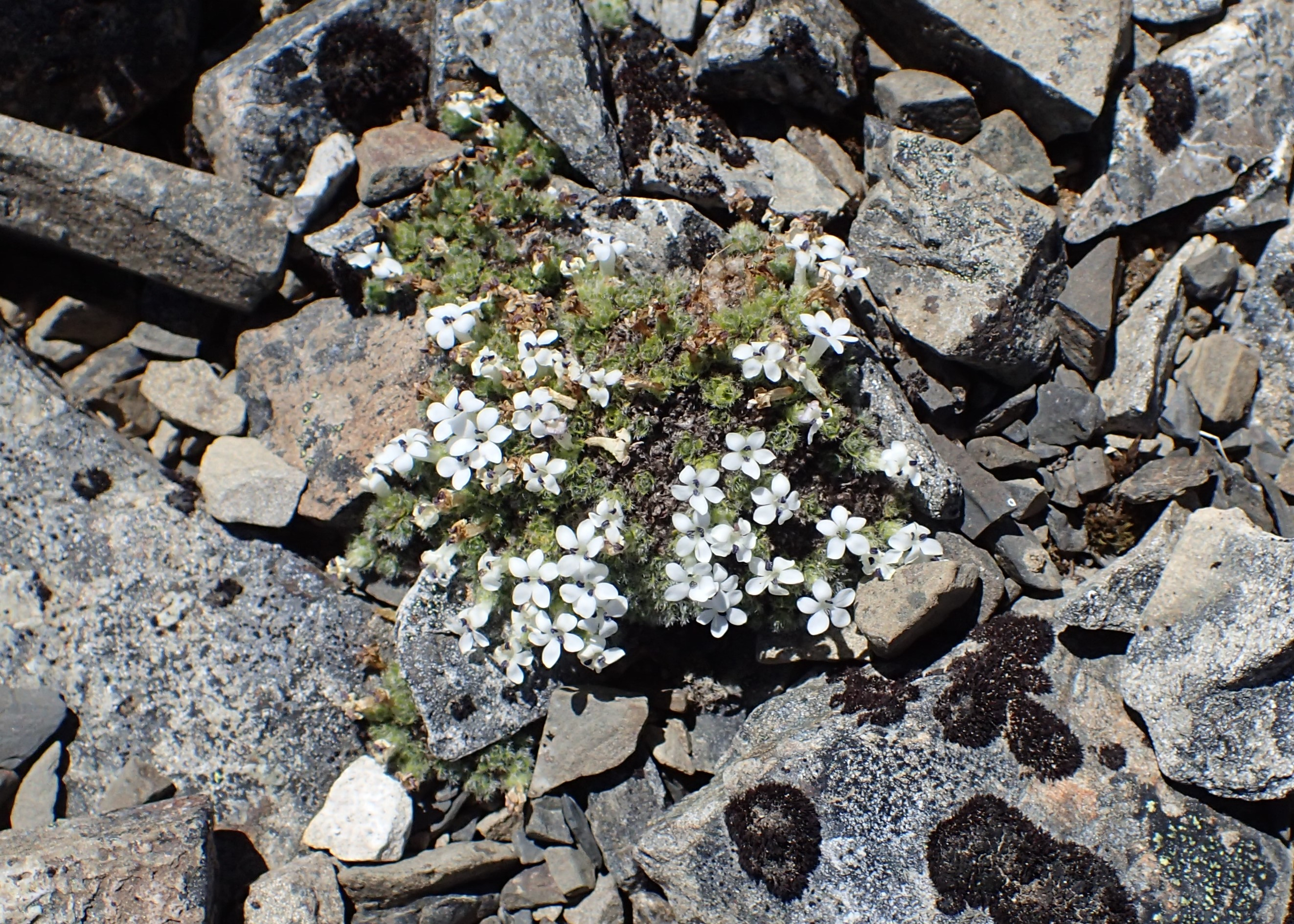
Habit

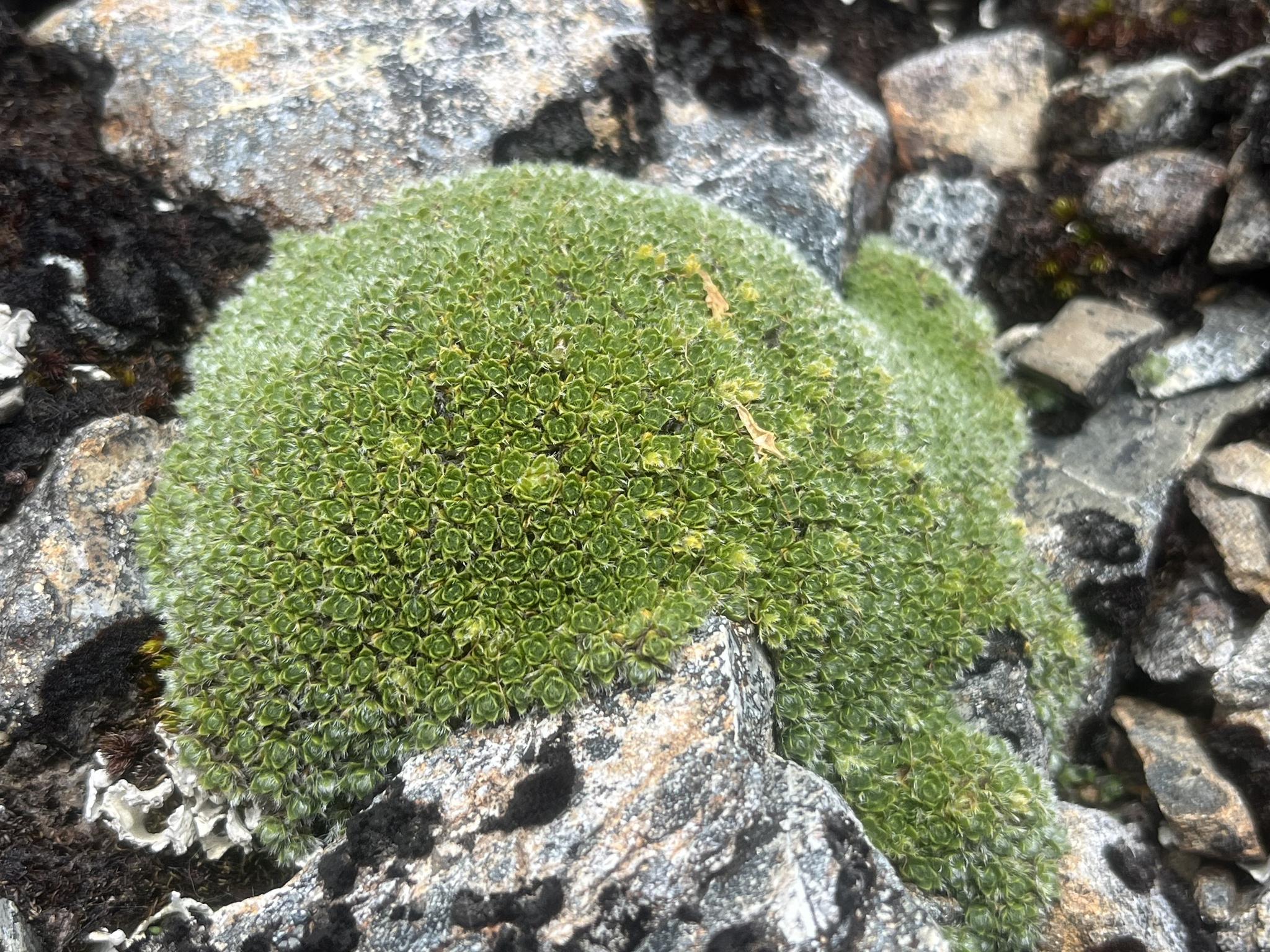
Habit
