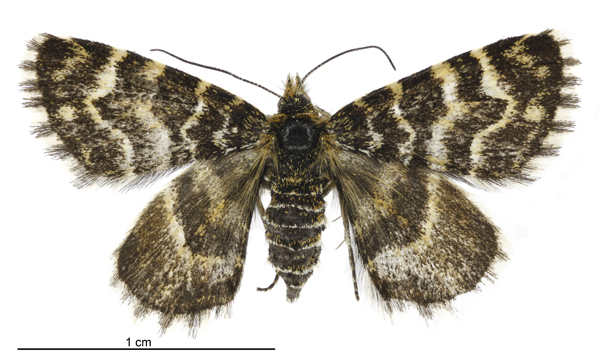
- Female
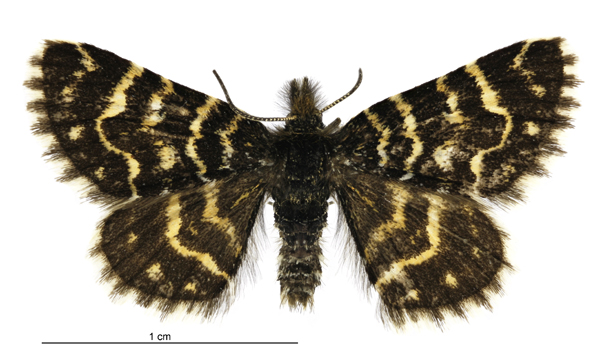
- Male

Conservation status
- Declining (NZ TCS)

Scientific classification
- Kingdom: Animalia
- Phylum: Arthropoda
- Clade: Pancrustacea
- Class: Insecta
- Order: Lepidoptera
- Family: Geometridae
- Genus: Dasyuris
- Species: D. micropolis

Binomial name
- Dasyuris micropolis Meyrick, 1929

= Dasyuris micropolis =

Species of moth endemic to New Zealand

Dasyuris micropolis is a species of moth in the family Geometridae. This species was first described by Edward Meyrick in 1929. It is endemic to New Zealand and have been observed in the South Island. This species frequents montane habitat. Adults are day flying and have been observed in January. It has been suggested that the larval host plants of this species are in the genus Veronica, specifically Veronica densifolia or Veronica thomsonii. D. micropolis has been classified in 2025 as having the New Zealand conservation status of "At Risk, Declining".

== Taxonomy ==
This species was first described by Edward Meyrick in 1929. George Hudson discussed and illustrated this species in his 1939 book A supplement to the butterflies and moths of New Zealand. The male lectotype, collected by Hudson at Arthur's Pass, is held at the Natural History Museum, London.

== Description ==
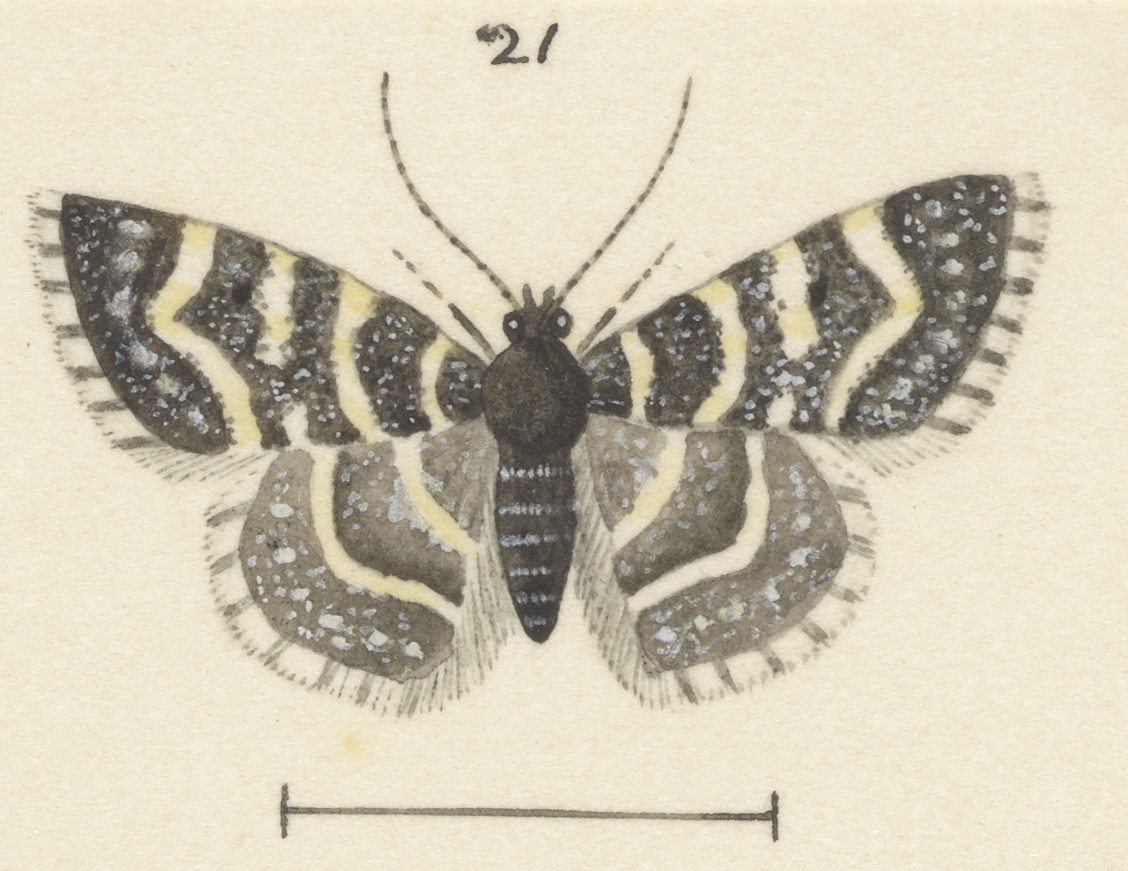
Hudson's illustration of female.

Meyrick described this species as follows:

♂ ♀. 16-19 mm. Head, palpi black, ♀ mixed white. Thorax black, hairs somewhat mixed yellow-whitish, especially in ♀, front and tegulae ♂ sprinkled white scales. Abdomen black, segmental margins more or less irrorated white, more strongly beneath. Forewings triangular, termen rounded, rather oblique; dark fuscous, slightly and irregularly sprinkled whitish; subbasal, first, median, second, and subterminal white or whitish lines or slender streaks, first two rather curved, median somewhat irregular or slightly angulated in middle, second more or less obtusely angulated in middle, subterminal irregular, usually macular or sometimes almost obsolete: cilia white barred grey. Hindwings dark grey; a somewhat obtusely angulated whitish or yellow-whitish postmedian line; in ♀ also an oblique yellow-whitish antemedian shade or streak, and macular subterminal line; cilia white, indistinctly barred grey. Forewings beneath dark fuscous with five yellowish-white fasciae, first two broad and confluent, occupying basal ⅖ of wing, third moderate, straight or rather angulated, fourth moderate, angulated, fifth narrow, mostly macular. Hindwings beneath blackish, ♂ with broad oblique ante-median and curved postmedian yellow-whitish fasciae and some irregular irroration, ♀ also with broad subbasal fascia, and posterior fascia confluent with a subterminal fascia nearly extending to termen.

This species is similar in appearance to D. leucobathra but can be distinguished from that species as D. micropolis is smaller in size, has a different undersurface and an absence of bright yellow colouring on the veins of the upper surface as well as a much paler yellowish tinge on under surface generally.

== Distribution ==
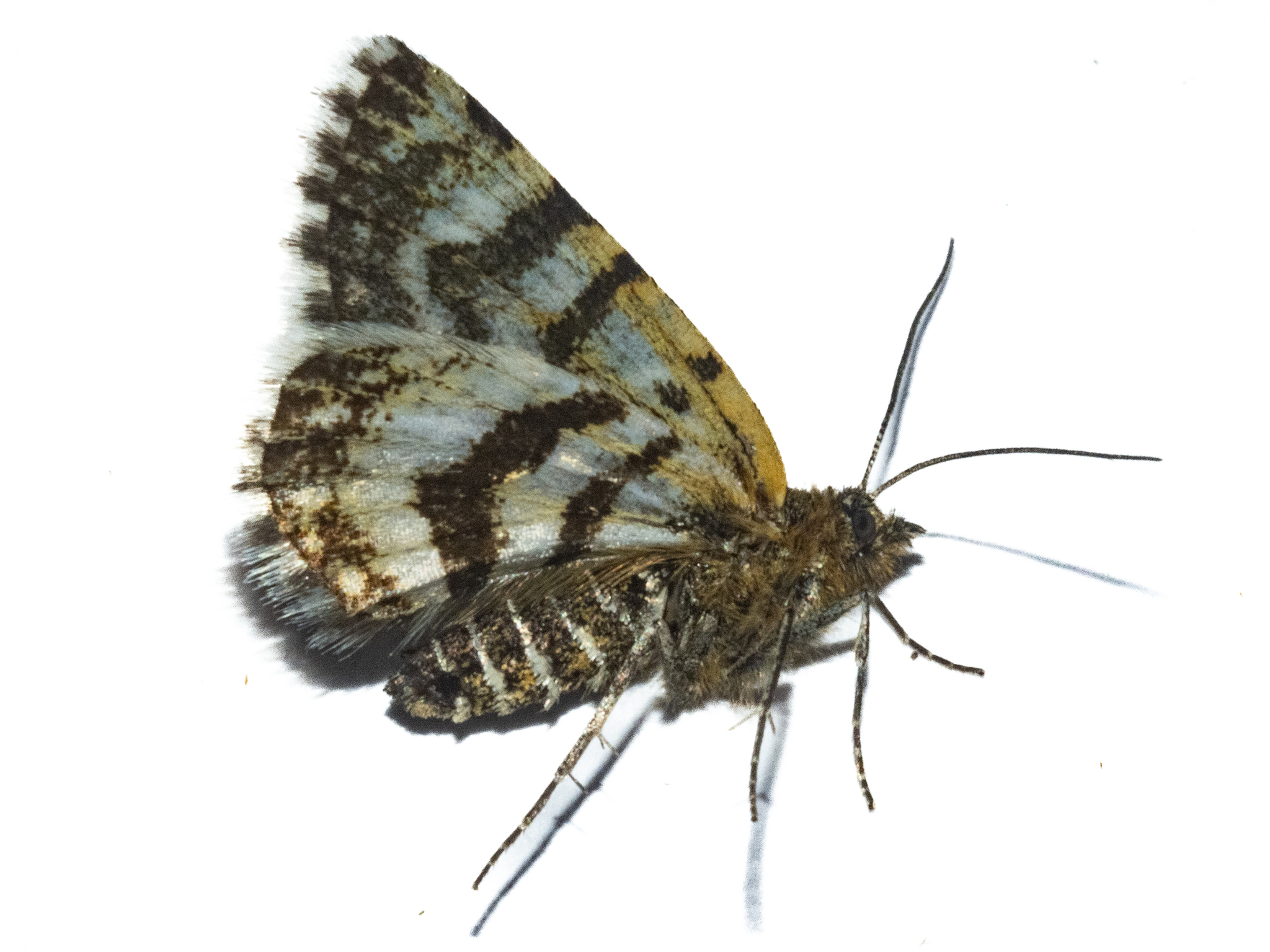
Underside of wings.

D. micropolis is endemic to New Zealand and have been observed in the South Island.

== Habitat and hosts ==
This species frequents montane habitat. It has been hypothesised that the larvae are hosted by species of Veronica, specifically Veronica densifolia or Veronica thomsonii.

== Behaviour ==
The adults are day flying and are on the wing in January.

== Conservation status ==
In 2025 this moth was classified under the New Zealand Threat Classification system as being "At Risk, Declining" as a result of being biologically sparse and suffering from population fragmentation.
