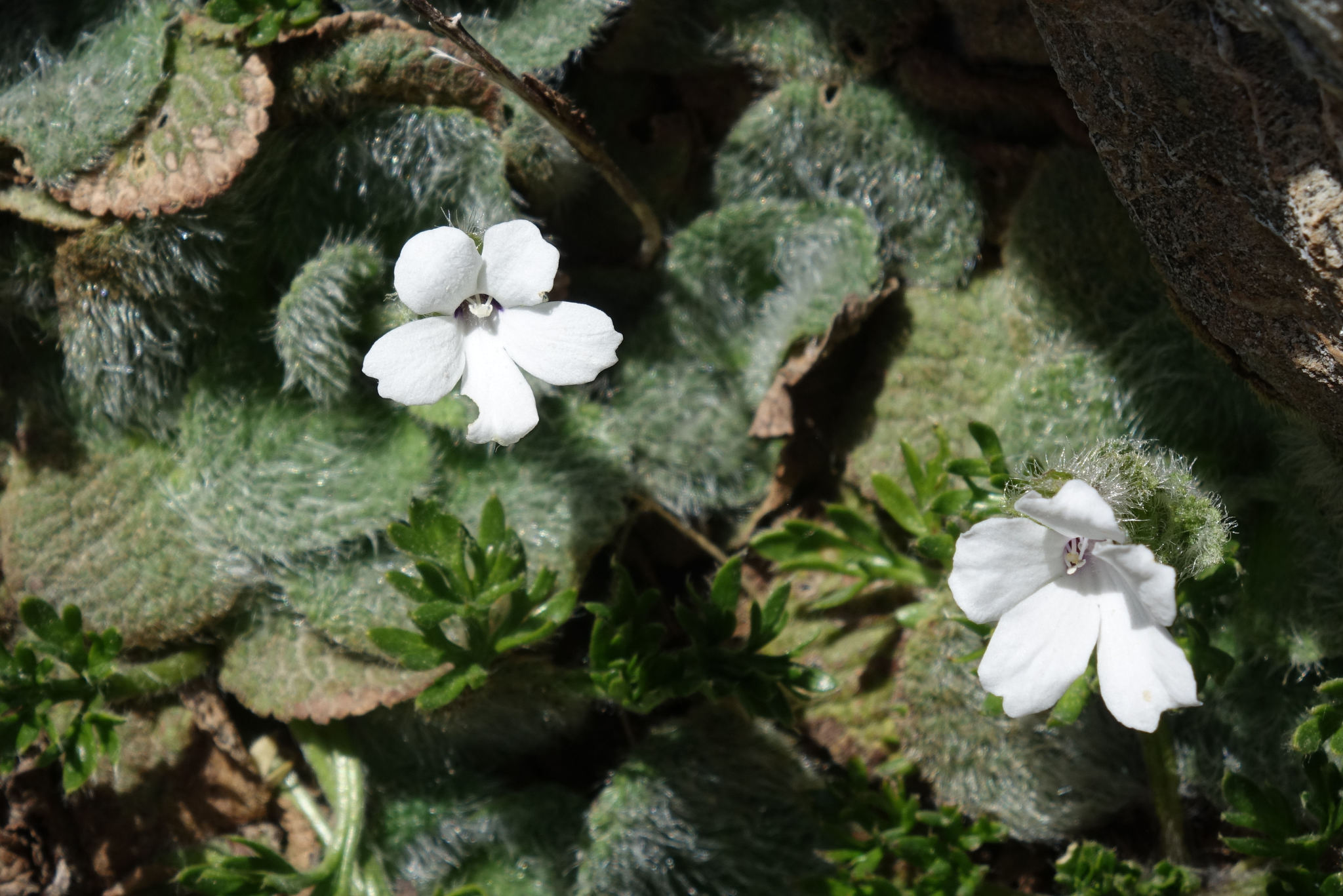
- Flowering Ourisia sessilifolia subsp. splendida observed in Mt Cook National Park, South Island, New Zealand

Conservation status
- Not Threatened (NZ TCS)

Scientific classification
- Kingdom: Plantae
- Clade: Embryophytes
- Clade: Tracheophytes
- Clade: Spermatophytes
- Clade: Angiosperms
- Clade: Eudicots
- Clade: Asterids
- Order: Lamiales
- Family: Plantaginaceae
- Genus: Ourisia
- Species: O. sessilifolia
- Subspecies: O. s. subsp. splendida

Trinomial name
- Ourisia sessilifolia subsp. splendida (L.B.Moore) Arroyo

Synonyms
- Ourisia sessilifolia var. splendida L.B.Moore

= Ourisia sessilifolia subsp. splendida =

Subspecies of flowering plant

Ourisia sessilifolia subsp. splendida is a subspecies of flowering plant in the family Plantaginaceae that is endemic to high-elevation habitats in the South Island and Stewart Island of New Zealand. Joseph Dalton Hooker described O. sessilifolia in 1864. Plants of this subspecies of New Zealand mountain foxglove are perennial, small-leaved, rosette herbs that are covered in a mixture of short glandular hairs and long non-glandular hairs. They have hairy, crenate, ovate leaves that are in a basal rosette. The flowers are in pairs or whorls in each node, with a and regular calyx and a white regular corolla. The corolla tube is purple inside, with one line of white hairs inside, and purple outside. It is listed as Not Threatened.

== Taxonomy ==
Ourisia sessilifolia subsp. spendida (L.B.Moore) Arroyo is in the plant family Plantaginaceae. Joseph Dalton Hooker described O. sessilifolia Hook.f. in Volume I of his Handbook of the New Zealand Flora in 1864.

Lucy Moore was the first to recognise infraspecific taxa within O. sessilifolia in 1961, and she used the rank of variety for O. sessilifolia var. splendida L.B.Moore. Mary Kalin Arroyo changed the rank of the two varieties to subspecies in 1984.

The type material of O. sessilifolia var. splendida was collected by Leonard Cockayne in 1897 at Arthur's Pass, South Island, New Zealand. The holotype and an isotype are both housed at the herbarium of the Museum of New Zealand Te Papa Tongarewa.

This is one of two allopatric subspecies that are recognized: Ourisia sessilifolia subsp. splendida can be distinguished from O. sessilifolia subsp. sessilifolia by having one line of hairs inside the corolla tube vs three lines of hairs.

== Description ==
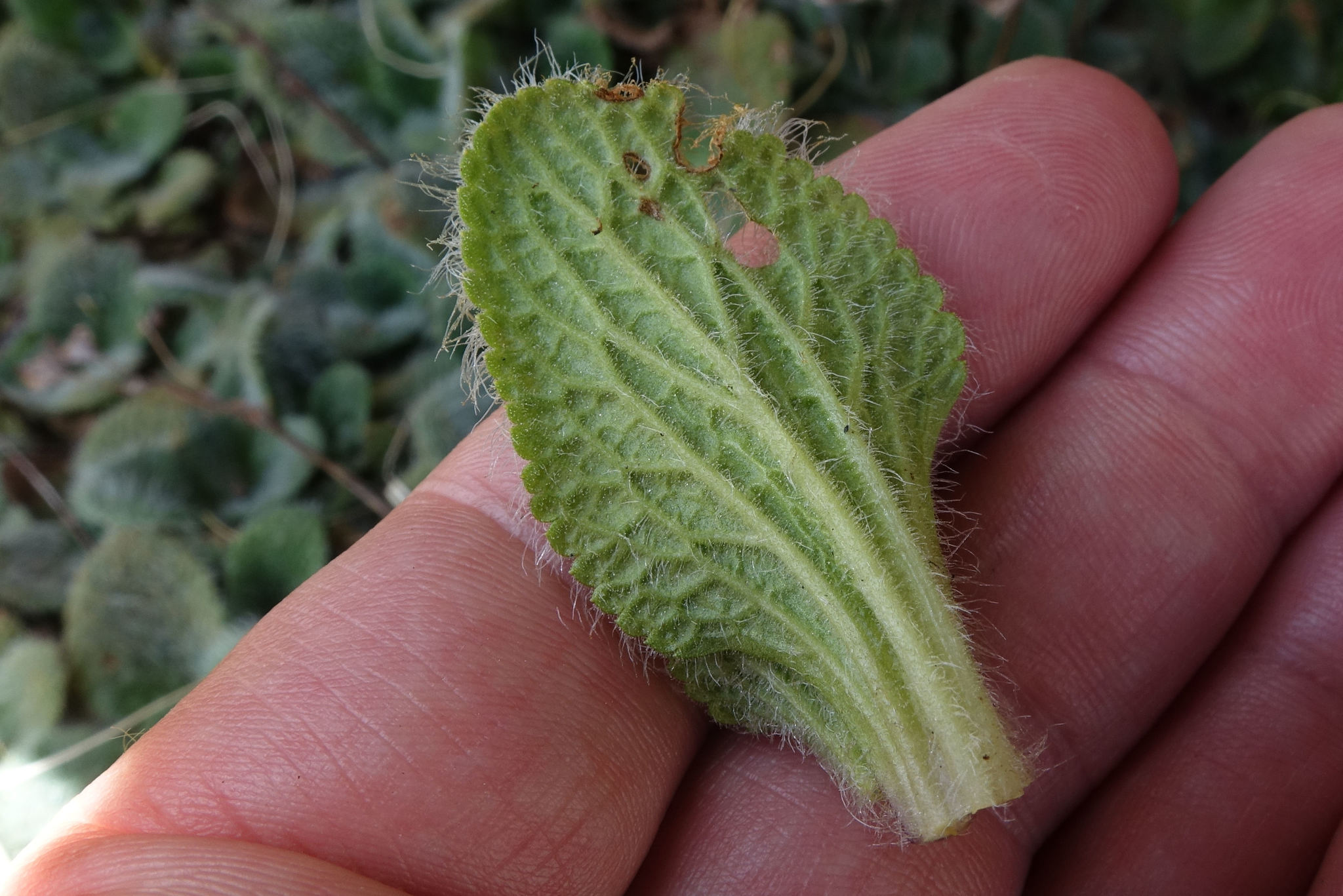
Close-up of underside of rosette leaf of O. sessilifiolia subsp. splendida showing the mixture of long non-glandular hairs and the short glandular hairs

Ourisia sessilifolia subsp. splendida plants are perennial herbs. The stems are creeping, with opposite leaves that are tightly packed into rosettes or subrosettes. Leaf petioles are 3.9–29.8 mm long. Leaf blades are 12.2–59.1 mm long by 9.7–44.5 mm wide (length: width ratio 1.1–1.5: 1), broadly ovate to very broadly ovate, widest below the middle, with a rounded apex, cuneate base and regularly crenate edges. Leaves are densely hairy with a mixture of short glandular hairs and longer non-glandular hairs on both surfaces, especially on the prominent veins on the lower surface. Inflorescences are erect, with hairy racemes (sometimes densely hairy) up to 202 mm (8.0 in) long, with a mixture of glandular and non-glandular hairs, and with 2–5 flowering nodes and up to 10 total flowers per raceme. Each flowering node has 1–4 flowers and 2 sessile, sometimes clasping bracts that are oblanceolate to narrowly obovate or narrowly elliptic. The lowest bracts are similar to the leaves, 11.6–18.6 mm long and 4.4–12.2 mm wide, and become smaller toward the apex of the raceme. The flowers are borne on a densely hairy pedicel that is up to 19.5 mm long and usually has a mixture of non-glandular and glandular hairs. The calyx is 6.3–10.4 mm long, regular, internally glabrous, with all lobes equally divided to the base, and often densely hairy with a mixture of glandular and non-glandular hairs. The corolla is 13.8–21.4 mm long (including the 4.3–9.3 mm long, straight corolla tube), bilabiate, tubular-funnelform, glabrous and white to purplish on the outside, and with one line of white hairs and purple on the inside. The corolla lobes are 4.9–13.9 mm long, spreading, and obovate. There are 4 stamens up to 9.6 mm long which are didynamous, with two long stamens reaching the corolla tube opening or slightly exserted, and 2 short stamens included inside the corolla; a staminode is present that is 0.8–1.3 mm long. The style is 4.3–7.1 mm long, exserted, with an emarginate stigma. The ovary is 1.7–3.4 mm long and glabrous. Fruits are capsules 4.4–7.6 mm long and c. 4.1–5.9 mm wide with loculicidal dehiscence and pedicels up to 34.0 mm long. There are c. 240 seeds in each capsule, 0.6–1.1 mm long and 0.4–0.6 mm long, with a two-layered, reticulate seed coat.

Ourisia sessilifolia subsp. splendida flowers from December to March and fruits from January to February.

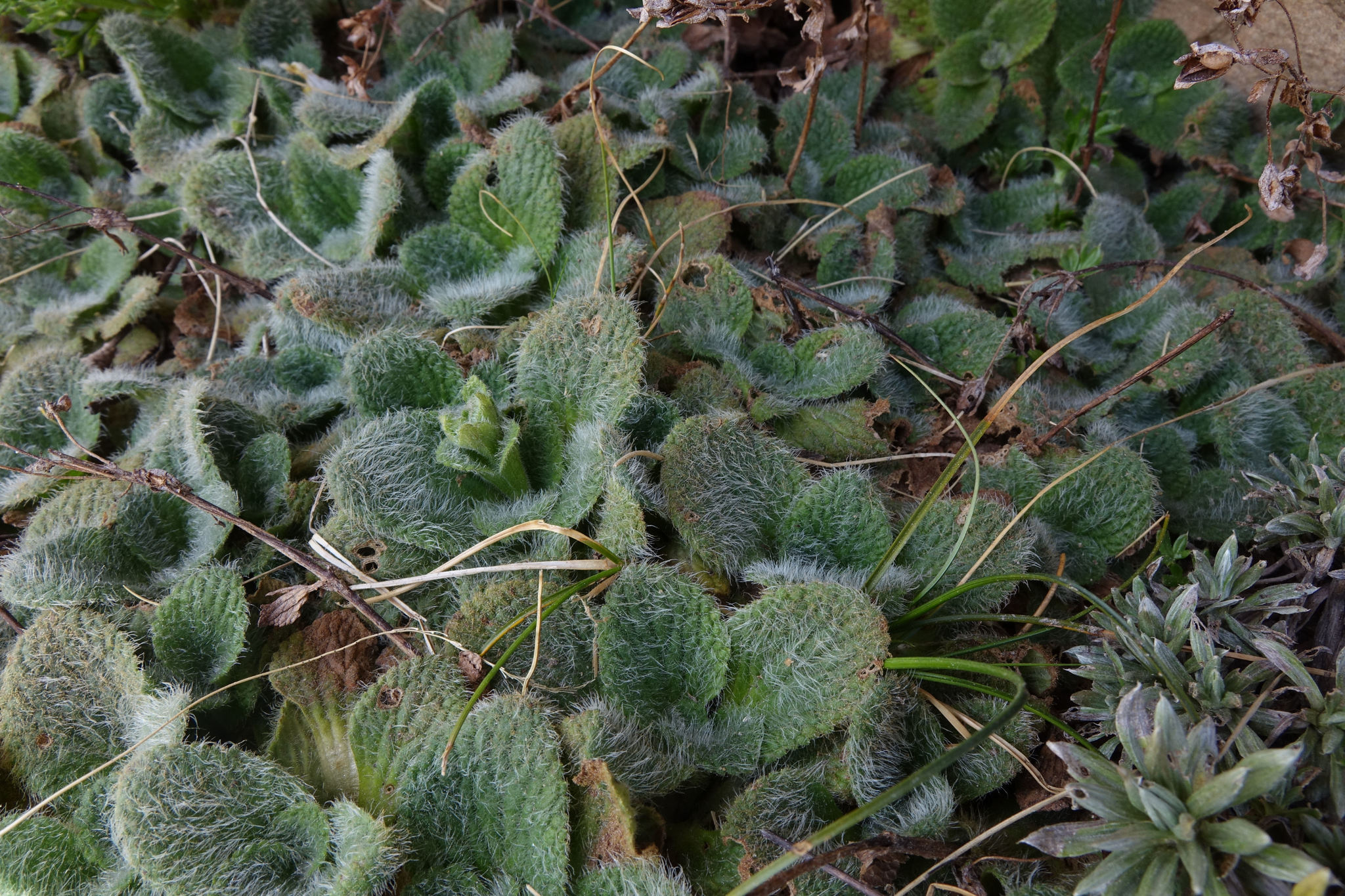
Rosettes of O. sessilifiolia subsp. splendida

The chromosome number of Ourisia sessilifolia subsp. splendida is 2n=48.

== Distribution and habitat ==
Ourisia sessilifolia subsp. splendida is a New Zealand mountain foxglove that is endemic to the South Island of New Zealand. It is found in along the main divide in the Southern Alps in Canterbury and Westland. It occupies high-elevation herbfields, meadows and grasslands in rocky habitats from 1,140 to 1,800 m (3,740 to 5,910 ft) above sea level.

== Phylogeny ==
One individual of O. sessilifolia subsp. splendida was included in phylogenetic analyses of all species of the genus Ourisia using standard DNA sequencing markers (two nuclear ribosomal DNA markers and two chloroplast DNA regions) and morphological data. In the nuclear and combined molecular analyses, it was sister to the individual of O. sessilifolia subsp. sessilifolia and both belonged to the highly supported New Zealand lineage, but their placement was not well resolved within that clade in any of the trees.

In another phylogenetic study using amplified fragment length polymorphisms (AFLPs), the 5 sampled individuals of O. sessilifolia subsp. splendida were monophyletic and nested within a clade of 12 individuals of O. sessilifolia subsp. sessilifolia. All 17 sampled individuals of O. sessilifolia formed a highly supported clade that was placed with strong support near O. simpsonii. The 17 sampled individuals of O. sessilifolia also comprised one of the significant clusters in the Bayesian clustering analysis.

== Conservation status ==
Ourisia sessilifolia subsp. splendida is listed as Not Threatened in the most recent assessment (2017–2018) of the New Zealand Threatened Classification for plants.
