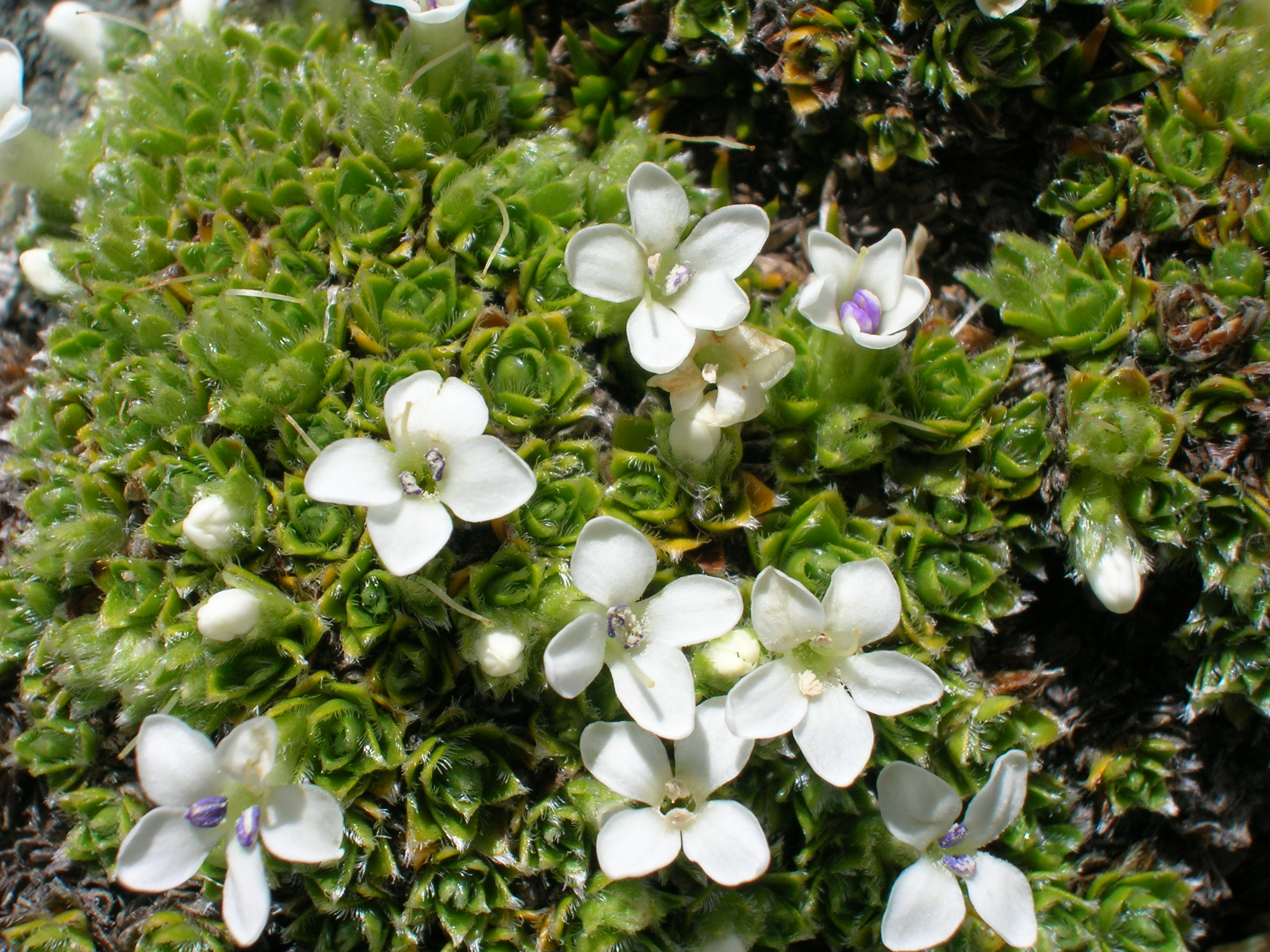

Conservation status
- Not Threatened (NZ TCS)

Scientific classification
- Kingdom: Plantae
- Clade: Tracheophytes
- Clade: Angiosperms
- Clade: Eudicots
- Clade: Asterids
- Order: Lamiales
- Family: Plantaginaceae
- Genus: Veronica
- Species: V. ciliolata

Binomial name
- Veronica ciliolata (Hook.f.) Cheeseman: Pygmea ciliolata Hook.f.; Chionohebe ciliolata (Hook.f.) B.G.Briggs & Ehrend.

= Veronica ciliolata =

Species of flowering plant

Veronica ciliolata, one of the cushion snow hebes, is a species of flowering plant native to New Zealand and Australia. It belongs to the family Plantaginaceae. It is endemic to high elevation habitats of the mountains of the southern and western South Island of New Zealand, mostly west of the main divide. Joseph Dalton Hooker described Pygmea ciliolata in 1864, which was transferred to the genus Veronica in 1906 by Thomas Cheeseman. The conservation status of V. ciliolata is not threatened.

== Taxonomy ==
Veronica ciliolata belongs to the family Plantaginaceae. Joseph Dalton Hooker first described this species in Volume I of his Handbook of the New Zealand Flora in 1864 as Pygmea ciliolata. New Zealand botanist Thomas Cheeseman transferred the species to the genus Veronica in 1906. In 1976, it was transferred to yet another genus when Barbara Briggs and Friedrich Ehrendorfer treated the species as Chionohebe ciliolata. However, many botanists now recognise the species as Veronica ciliolata in a more broadly circumscribed Veronica.

The lectotype specimen was collected by Julius von Haast near the Hopkins River, South Island, New Zealand, and is housed at the Kew Herbarium.

Veronica ciliolata is one of four cushion plants and six other small herbs or subshrubs in the snow hebe lineage. The distribution and location of hairs are important characters in distinguishing V. ciliolata from other snow hebe species. The species name ciliolata refers to the leaves that have hairs present on edges of the leaves only which are otherwise glabrous (hairless) on the upper and lower leaf surfaces, a characteristic that distinguishes V. ciliolata from the other cushion snow hebe species.

Two subspecies are recognized: Veronica ciliolata subsp. ciliolata and Veronica ciliolata subsp. fiordensis. The subspecies are largely allopatric, and can be distinguished from one another based on the presence or absence of hairs on the ovaries, distribution of hairs on the leaves, bracts and calyces, and leaf length:width ratio. Morphological analyses showed that the delimitation and geography of these subspecies differs from the varieties originally described by Margot B. Ashwin.

Cushion habit

Close up of cushion showing leaves with ciliate edges

== Description ==
Veronica ciliolata plants are perennial cushions with a woody base.

== Distribution and habitat ==
Veronica ciliolata is native to the New Zealand and Australia. V. ciliolata subsp. ciliolata is found from northern Westland to southern Fiordland, whereas V. ciliolata subsp. fiordensis is found in eastern Fiordland and Tasmania. V. ciliolata is found in subalpine to alpine rocky areas from 910 to 2060 m above sea level.

== Conservation status ==
The two subspecies of Veronica ciliolata have different conservation status listings in the most recent assessment (2023) under the New Zealand Threatened Classification system for plants. Veronica ciliolata subsp. ciliolata is considered to be Not Threatened, whereas V. ciliolata subsp. fiordensis is At Risk - Naturally Uncommon with the following qualifiers: "Sp" (Biologically Sparse), "DPS" (Data Poor: Size); "DPT" (Data Poor: Trend), "RR" (Range Restricted) and "SO (Secure Overseas).
