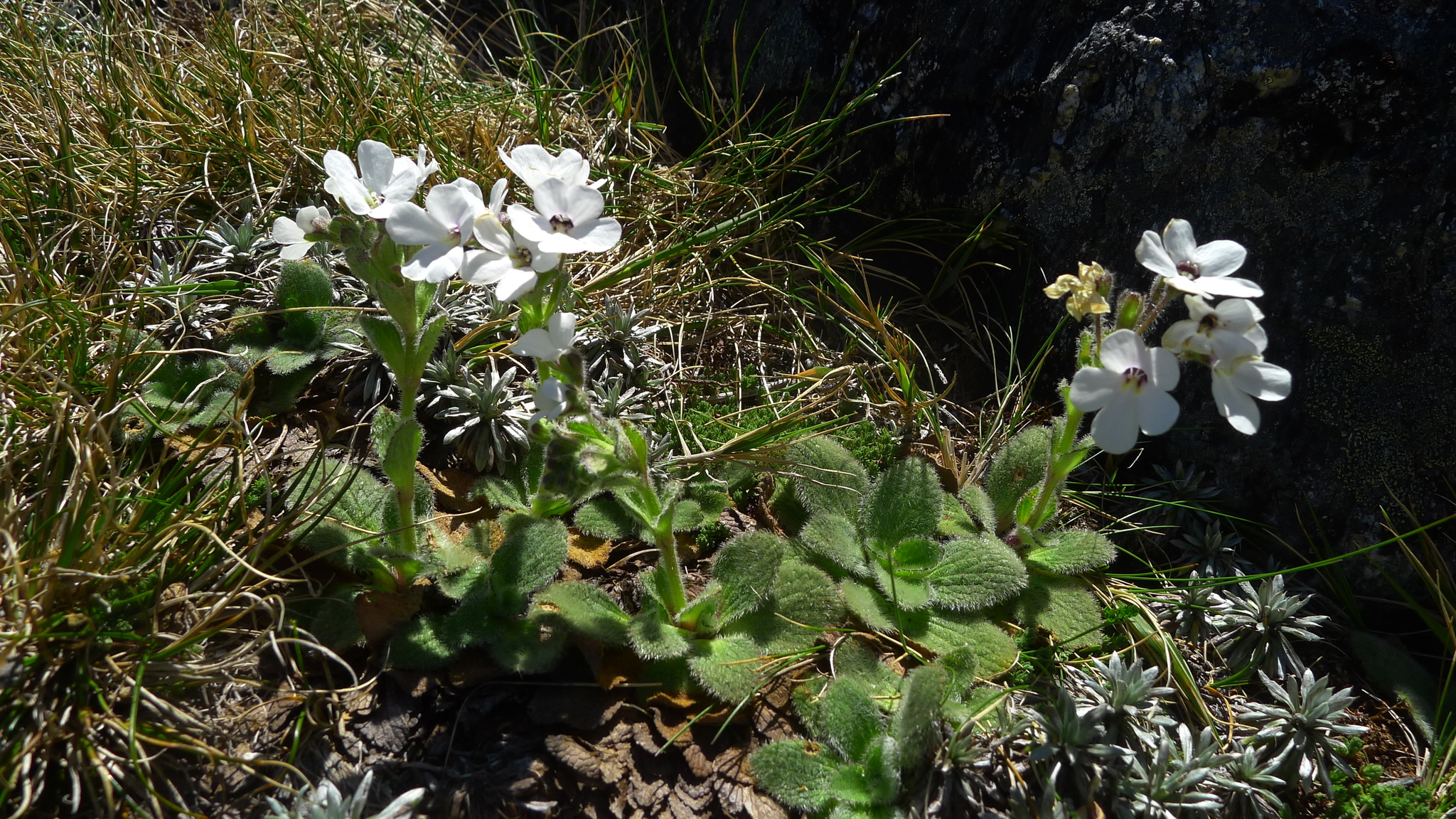
- Flowering O. sessilifolia subsp. sessilifolia observed in south Westland, South Island, New Zealand

Conservation status
- Not Threatened (NZ TCS)

Scientific classification
- Kingdom: Plantae
- Clade: Tracheophytes
- Clade: Angiosperms
- Clade: Eudicots
- Clade: Asterids
- Order: Lamiales
- Family: Plantaginaceae
- Genus: Ourisia
- Species: O. sessilifolia
- Subspecies: O. s. subsp. sessilifolia

Trinomial name
- Ourisia sessilifolia subsp. sessilifolia Hook.f.

= Ourisia sessilifolia subsp. sessilifolia =

Subspecies of flowering plant

Ourisia sessilifolia subsp. sessilifolia is a subspecies of flowering plant in the family Plantaginaceae that is endemic to high-elevation habitats in the South Island and Stewart Island of New Zealand. Joseph Dalton Hooker described O. sessilifolia in 1864. Plants of this subspecies of New Zealand mountain foxglove are perennial, small-leaved, rosette herbs that are covered in a mixture of short glandular hairs and long non-glandular hairs. They have hairy, crenate, ovate leaves that are in a basal rosette. The flowers are in pairs or whorls in each node, with a and regular calyx and a white regular corolla. The corolla tube is purple inside, with three lines of white hairs inside, and purple outside. It is listed as Not Threatened.

== Taxonomy ==
Ourisia sessilifolia subsp. sessilifolia is in the plant family Plantaginaceae. Joseph Dalton Hooker described O. sessilifolia Hook.f. in Volume I of his Handbook of the New Zealand Flora in 1864.

The type material was collected by Julius von Haast, at Mt Brewster, South Island, New Zealand. The holotype is housed at the herbarium of the Royal Botanic Gardens Kew.

Lucy Moore was the first to recognise infraspecific taxa within O. sessilifolia, and she used the rank of variety. Mary Kalin Arroyo changed the rank of the two varieties to subspecies in 1984.

This is one of two allopatric subspecies that are recognized: Ourisia sessilifolia subsp. sessilifolia can be distinguished from O. sessilifolia subsp. splendida by having three lines of hairs inside the corolla tube vs 1 line of hairs.

== Description ==
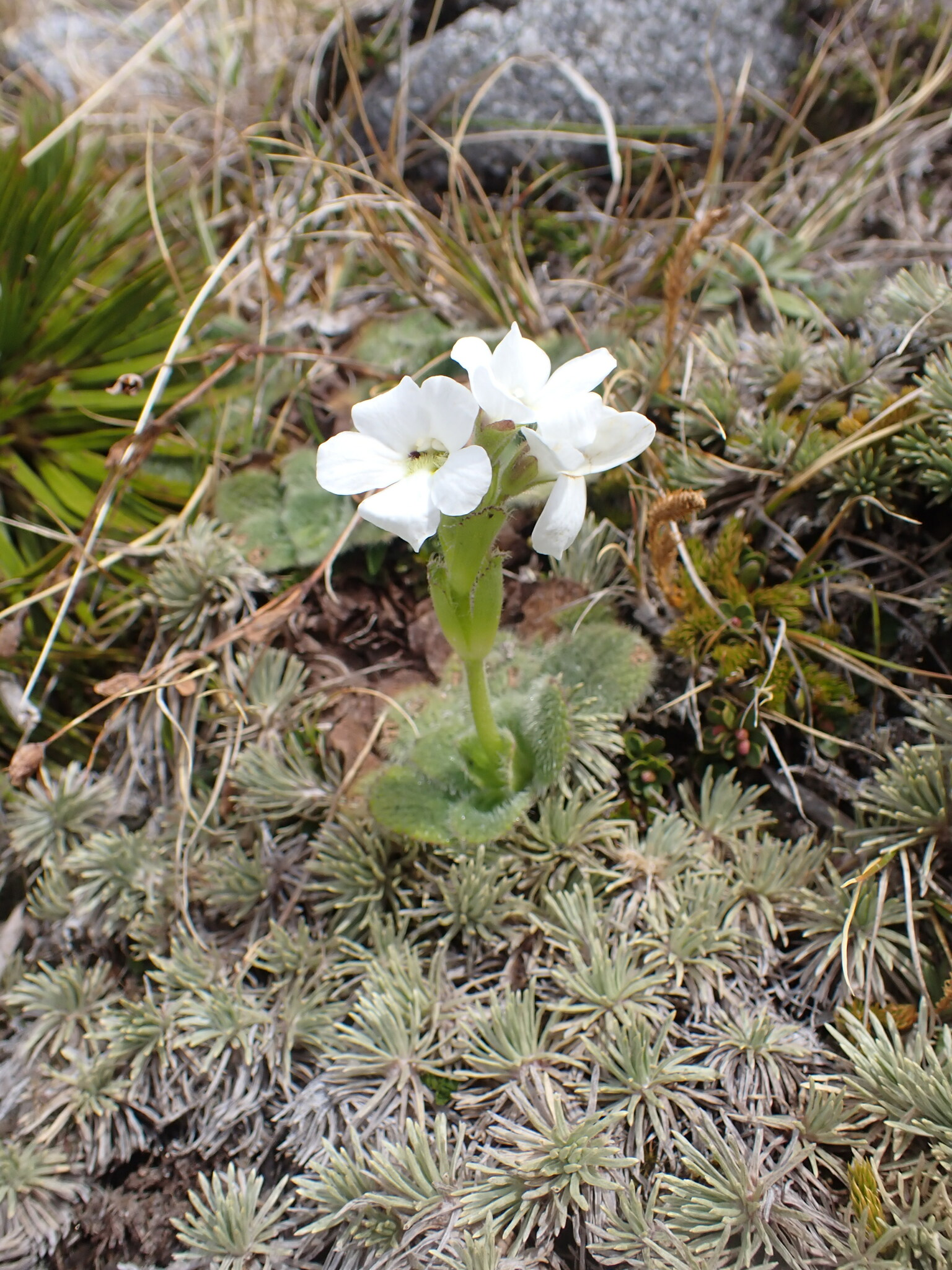
Flowering plant of O. sessilifiolia subsp. sessilifolia showing flower with three lines of white hairs inside the corolla tube

Ourisia sessilifolia subsp. sessilifolia plants are perennial herbs. The stems are creeping, with opposite leaves that are tightly packed into rosettes or subrosettes. Leaf petioles are 3.9–29.8 mm long. Leaf blades are 12.2–59.1 mm long by 9.7–44.5 mm wide (length: width ratio 1.1–1.5: 1), ovate to very broadly ovate, widest below the middle, with a rounded apex, cuneate base and regularly crenate edges. Leaves are densely hairy with a mixture of short glandular hairs and longer non-glandular hairs on both surfaces, especially on the prominent veins on the lower surface. Inflorescences are erect, with hairy racemes (sometimes densely hairy) up to 202 mm long, with a mixture of glandular and non-glandular hairs, and with 2–5 flowering nodes and up to 10 total flowers per raceme. Each flowering node has 1–4 flowers and 2 sessile, sometimes clasping bracts that are oblanceolate to narrowly obovate or narrowly elliptic. The lowest bracts are similar to the leaves, 11.6–18.6 mm long and 4.4–12.2 mm wide, and become smaller toward the apex of the raceme. The flowers are borne on a densely hairy pedicel that is up to 19.5 mm long and usually has a mixture of non-glandular and glandular hairs. The calyx is 6.3–10.4 mm long, regular, internally glabrous to densely covered with sessile glandular hairs, usually with all lobes equally divided to the base, and often densely hairy with a mixture of glandular and non-glandular hairs. The corolla is 13.8–21.4 mm long (including the 4.3–9.3 mm long, curved to straight, corolla tube), bilabiate, tubular-funnelform, glabrous and white to purplish on the outside, and with three lines of white hairs and purple on the inside. The corolla lobes are 4.9–13.9 mm long, spreading, and obovate. There are 4 stamens up to 9.6 mm long which are didynamous, with two long stamens reaching the corolla tube opening or slightly exserted, and 2 short stamens included inside the corolla; there is no staminode. The style is 4.3–7.1 mm long, exserted, with an emarginate stigma. The ovary is 1.7–3.4 mm long and glabrous. Fruits are capsules 4.4–7.6 mm long and c. 4.1–5.9 mm wide with loculicidal dehiscence and pedicels up to 34.0 mm long. There are c. 240 seeds in each capsule, 0.6–1.1 mm long and 0.4–0.6 mm long, with a two-layered, reticulate seed coat.

Ourisia sessilifolia subsp. sessilifolia flowers from December to April and fruits from December to March.

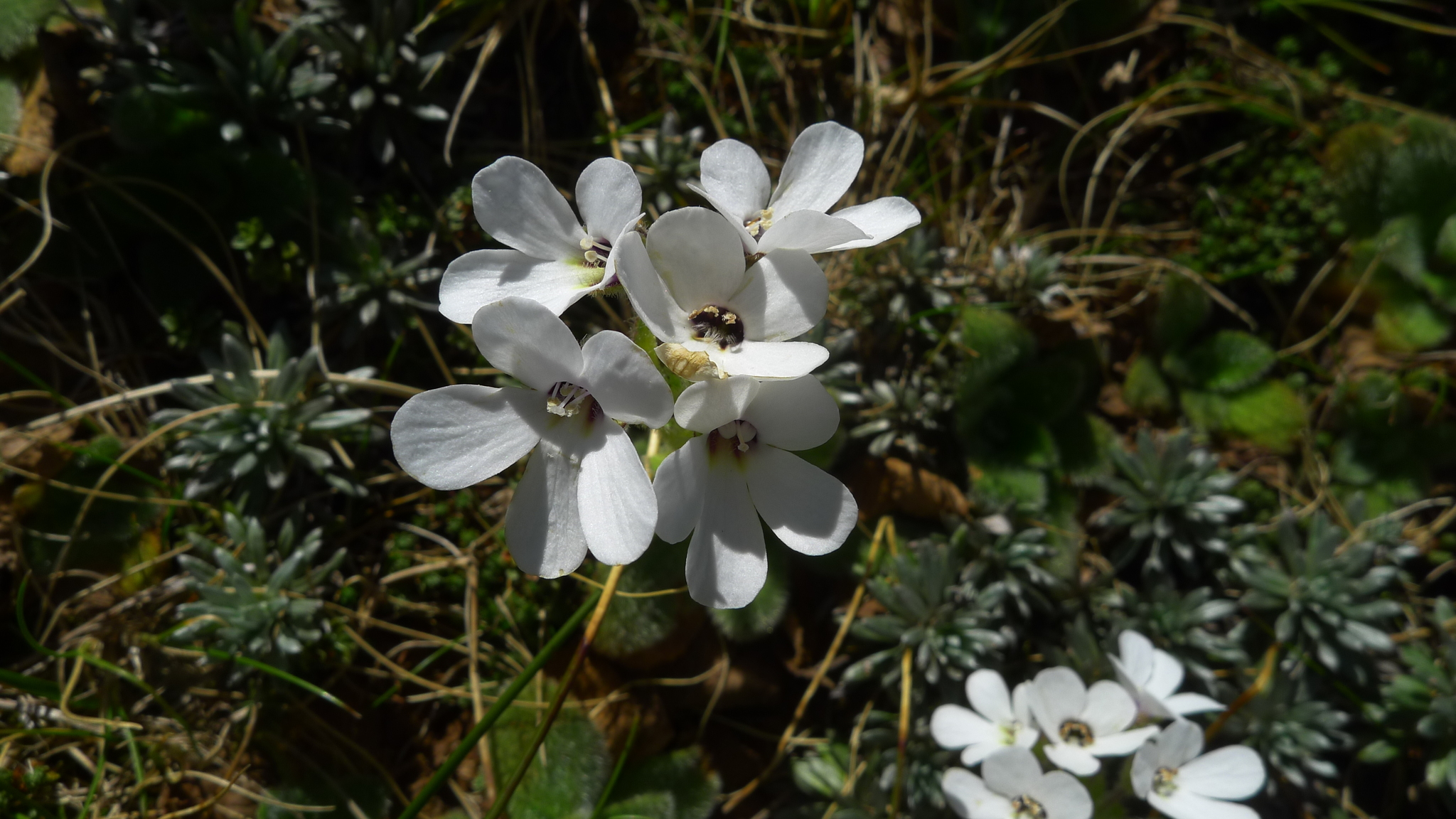
Flowers of O. sessilifiolia subsp. sessilifolia with 3 lines of white hairs inside the corolla tube

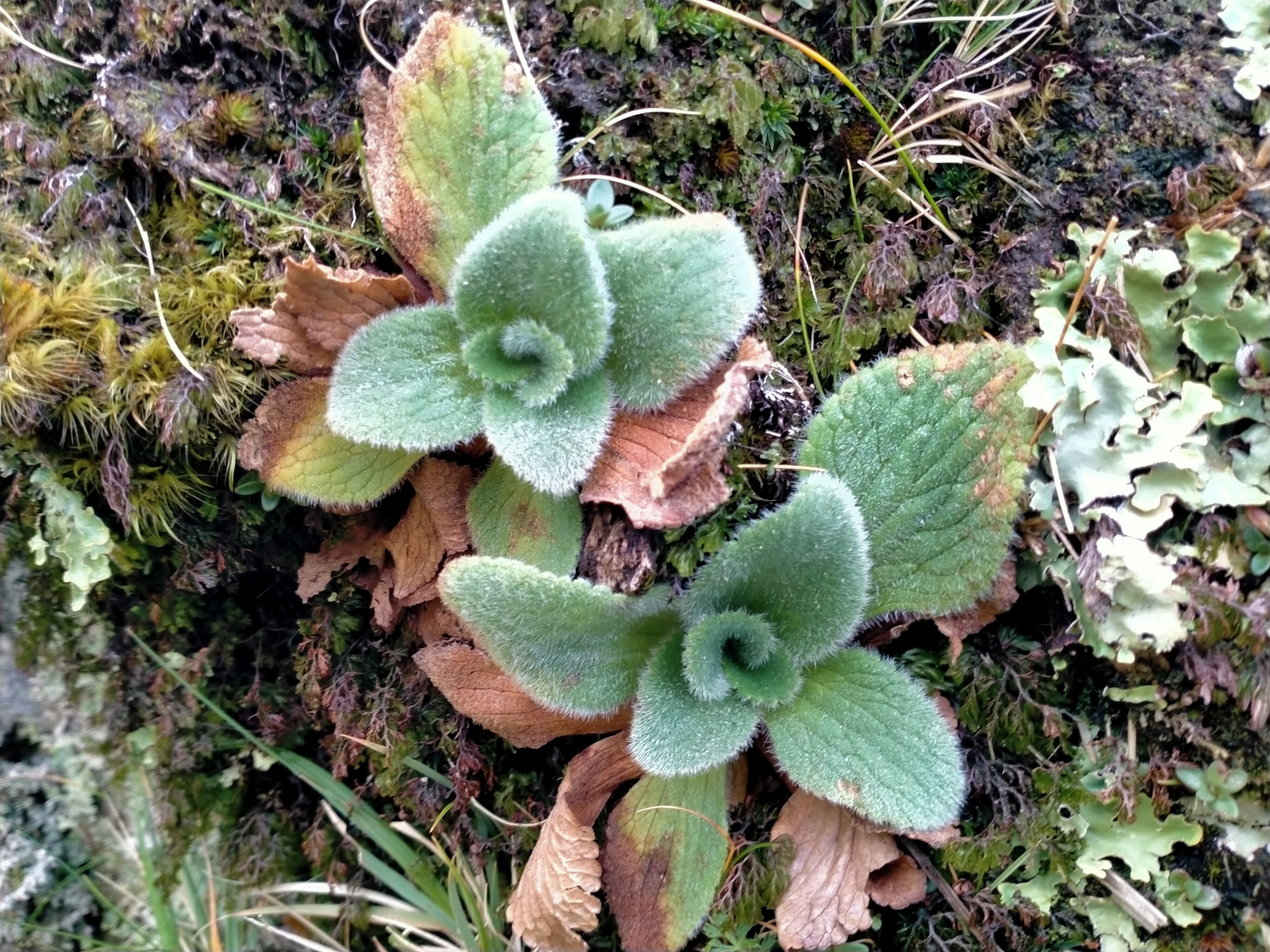
Close-up of rosettes of O. sessilifolia subsp. sessilifolia

The chromosome number of Ourisia sessilifolia subsp. sessilifolia is 2n=48.

== Distribution and habitat ==
Ourisia sessilifolia subsp. sessilifolia is a New Zealand mountain foxglove that is endemic to the South Island and Stewart Island of New Zealand. It has a disjunct geographic distribution in the South Island, being found in Western Nelson and northern Canterbury in the north, and then in southern Westland, Otago, Southland and Fiordland in the south, as well as on Stewart Island. It occupies high-elevation herbfields, meadows and grasslands in damp, shaded habitats near rocks, cliffs, and slopes from 800 to 2,100 m (2,600 to 6,900 ft) above sea level.

== Phylogeny ==
One individual of O. sessilifolia subsp. sessilifolia was included in phylogenetic analyses of all species of the genus Ourisia using standard DNA sequencing markers (two nuclear ribosomal DNA markers and two chloroplast DNA regions) and morphological data. In the nuclear and combined molecular analyses, it was sister to the individual of O. sessilifolia subsp. splendida and both belonged to the highly supported New Zealand lineage, but their placement was not well resolved within that clade in any of the trees.

In another phylogenetic study using amplified fragment length polymorphisms (AFLPs), the 12 sampled individuals of O. sessilifolia subsp. sessilifolia were paraphyletic with a clade of 5 individuals of O. sessilifolia subsp. splendida nested within it. All 17 sampled individuals of O. sessilifolia formed a highly supported clade that was placed with strong support near O. simpsonii. The 17 sampled individuals of O. sessilifolia also comprised one of the significant clusters in the Bayesian clustering analysis.

== Conservation status ==
Ourisia sessilifolia subsp. sessilifolia is listed as Not Threatened in the most recent assessment (2017–2018) of the New Zealand Threatened Classification for plants.
