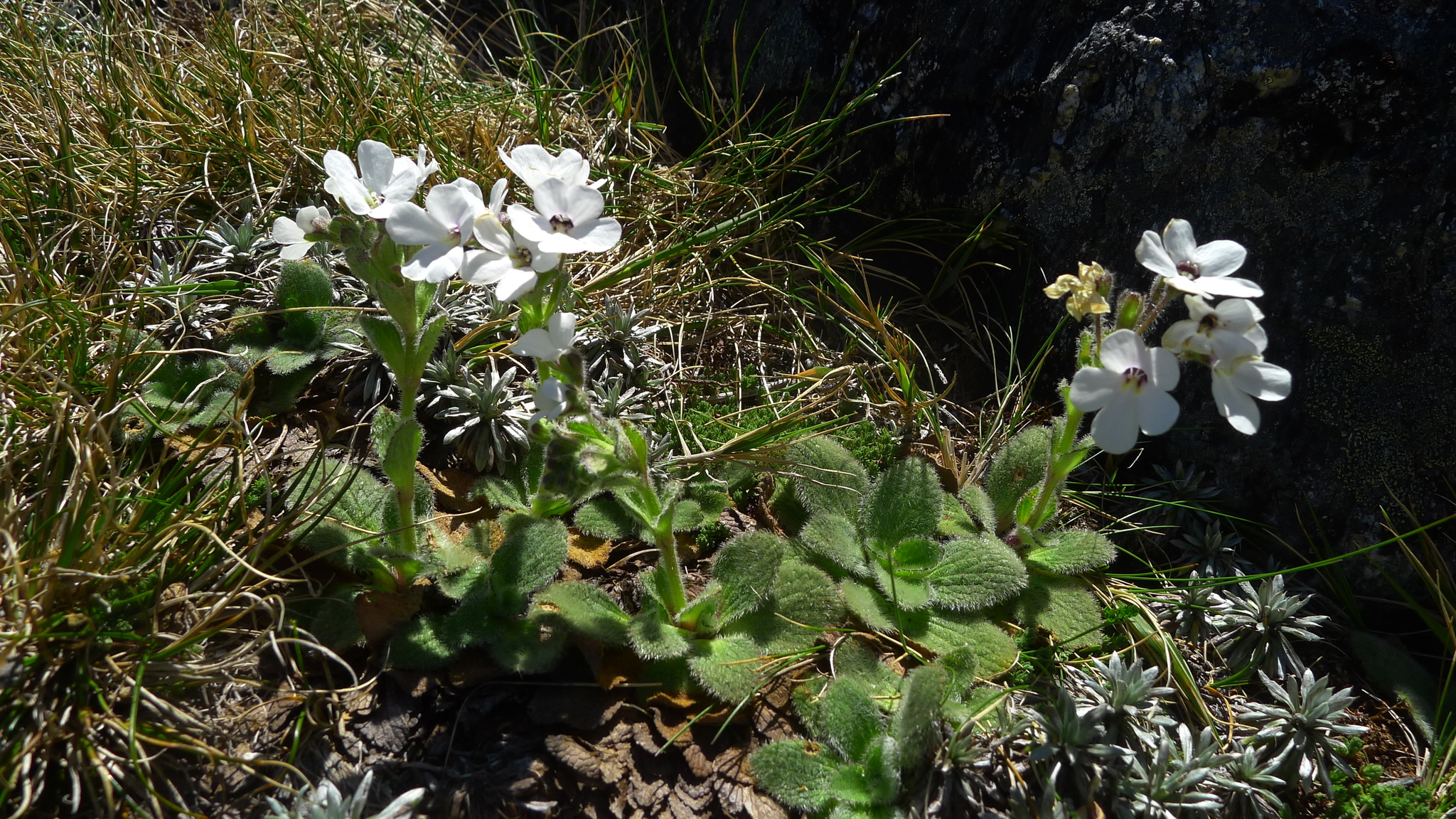
- Flowering O. sessilifolia observed in south Westland, South Island, New Zealand

Conservation status
- Not Threatened (NZ TCS)

Scientific classification
- Kingdom: Plantae
- Clade: Tracheophytes
- Clade: Angiosperms
- Clade: Eudicots
- Clade: Asterids
- Order: Lamiales
- Family: Plantaginaceae
- Genus: Ourisia
- Species: O. sessilifolia

Binomial name
- Ourisia sessilifolia Hook.f.

= Ourisia sessilifolia =

Species of flowering plant

Ourisia sessilifolia is a species of flowering plant in the family Plantaginaceae that is endemic to high-elevation habitats in the South Island and Stewart Island of New Zealand. Joseph Dalton Hooker described O. sessilifolia in 1864. Plants of this species of New Zealand mountain foxglove are perennial, small-leaved, rosette herbs that are covered in a mixture of short glandular hairs and long non-glandular hairs. They have hairy, crenate, ovate leaves that are in a basal rosette. The flowers are in pairs or whorls in each node, with a and regular calyx and a white regular corolla. The corolla tube is purple inside, with one or three lines of white hairs inside, and purple outside. It is listed as Not Threatened.

== Taxonomy ==
Ourisia sessilifolia Hook.f. is in the plant family Plantaginaceae. Joseph Dalton Hooker described O. sessilifolia in Volume I of his Handbook of the New Zealand Flora in 1864.

The type material was collected by Julius von Haast, at Mt Brewster, South Island, New Zealand. The holotype is housed at the herbarium of the Royal Botanic Gardens Kew.

Ourisia sessilifolia is morphologically similar to other New Zealand small-leaved species, namely O. simpsonii, with which it shares the subrosette or rosette habit, ovate to very broadly ovate or obovate to very broadly obovate leaves, irregular white corollas, and having a mixture of glandular and non-glandular hairs on many plant parts.

Ourisia sessilifolia can be distinguished from O. simpsonii by regular calyces (vs. irregular), flowers and bracts in pairs or whorls (vs. in pairs only), 1 or 3 lines of hairs and purple inside corolla tubes (vs. glabrous and yellow inside corolla tubes), and glandular hairs that are much shorter than the non-glandular hairs (vs. long glandular hairs that are the same size as the non-glandular hairs).

Ourisia sessilifolia is also similar to O. remotifolia but can be distinguished from that species by its erect rosette habit (vs. lax, semi-erect, non-rosette habit, leaves in tightly packed rosettes (vs. leaves with long petioles that are widely spaced along the stem), regular calyces (vs. irregular), flowers and bracts in pairs or whorls (vs. pairs only), and glandular hairs much shorter than non-glandular hairs (vs. all hairs the same length.

Two subspecies are recognized: Ourisia sessilifolia subsp. sessilifolia and O. sessilifolia subsp. splendida. The subspecies are allopatric, and can be distinguished from one another based on the number of lines of hairs inside the corolla tube.

== Description ==
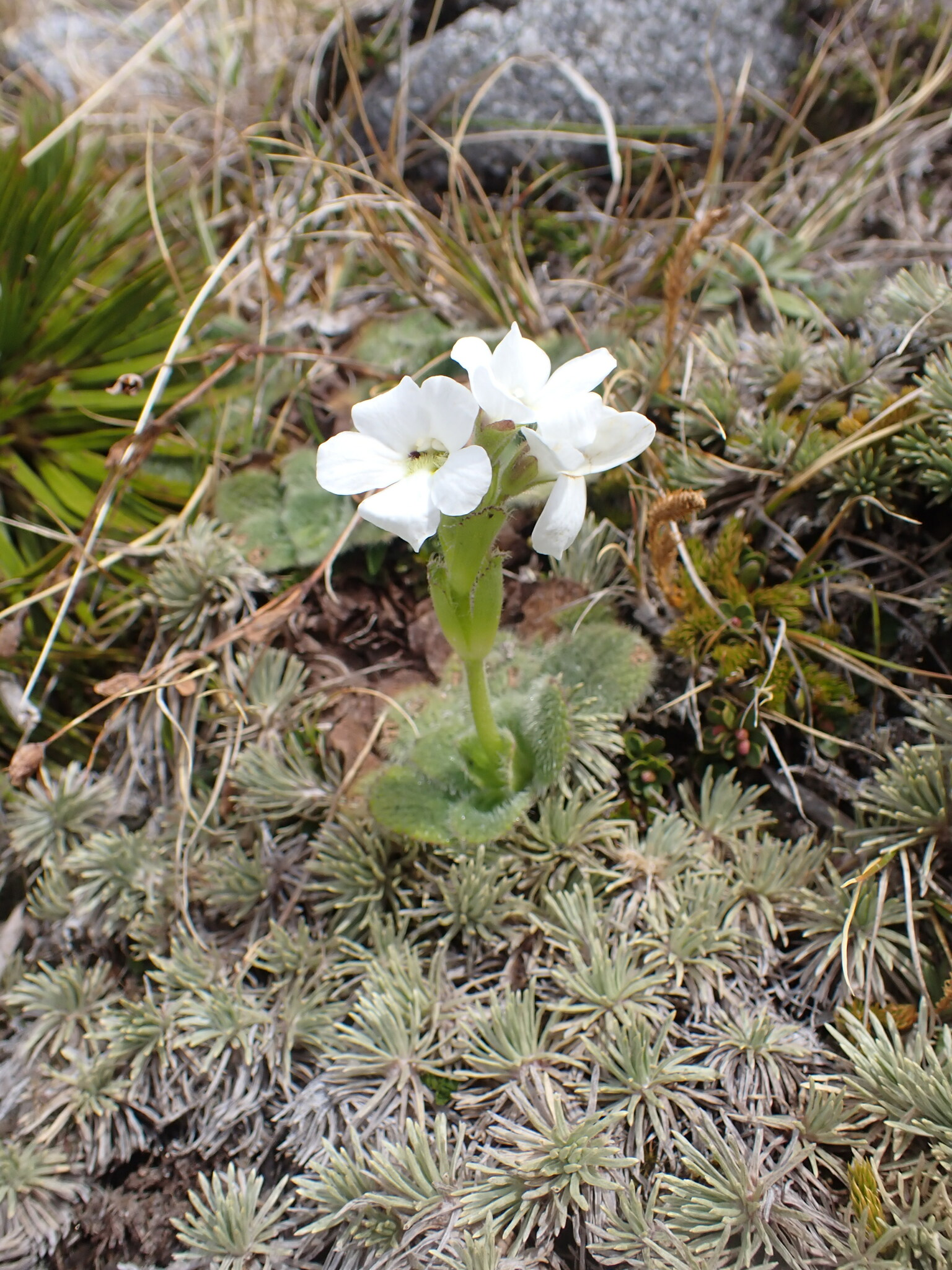
Flowering plant of O. sessilifiolia showing flower with three lines of white hairs inside the corolla tube

Ourisia sessilifolia plants are perennial herbs. The stems are creeping, with opposite leaves that are tightly packed into rosettes or subrosettes. Leaf petioles are 3.9–29.8 mm long. Leaf blades are 12.2–59.1 mm long by 9.7–44.5 mm wide (length: width ratio 1.1–1.5: 1), usually ovate to very broadly ovate, widest below the middle, with a rounded apex, cuneate base and regularly crenate edges. Leaves are densely hairy with a mixture of short glandular hairs and longer non-glandular hairs on both surfaces, especially on the prominent veins on the lower surface. Inflorescences are erect, with hairy racemes (sometimes densely hairy) up to 202 mm long, with a mixture of glandular and non-glandular hairs, and with 2–5 flowering nodes and up to 10 total flowers per raceme. Each flowering node has 1–4 flowers and 2 sessile, sometimes clasping bracts that are oblanceolate to narrowly obovate or narrowly elliptic. The lowest bracts are similar to the leaves, 11.6–18.6 mm long and 4.4–12.2 mm wide, and become smaller toward the apex of the raceme. The flowers are borne on a densely hairy pedicel that is up to 19.5 mm long and usually has a mixture of non-glandular and glandular hairs. The calyx is 6.3–10.4 mm long, regular, usually with all lobes equally divided to the base, and often densely hairy with a mixture of glandular and non-glandular hairs. The corolla is 13.8–21.4 mm long (including the 4.3–9.3 mm long corolla tube), bilabiate, tubular-funnelform, glabrous and white to purplish on the outside, and purple and with one or three lines of white hairs on the inside. The corolla lobes are 4.9–13.9 mm long, spreading, and obovate. There are 4 stamens up to 9.6 mm long which are didynamous, with two long stamens reaching the corolla tube opening or slightly exserted, and 2 short stamens included inside the corolla; a short staminode 0.8–1.3 mm long is also usually present. The style is 4.3–7.1 mm long, exserted, with an emarginate stigma. The ovary is 1.7–3.4 mm long and glabrous. Fruits are capsules 4.4–7.6 mm long and c. 4.1–5.9 mm wide with loculicidal dehiscence and pedicels up to 34.0 mm long. There are c. 240 seeds in each capsule, 0.6–1.1 mm long and 0.4–0.6 mm long, with a two-layered, reticulate seed coat.

Ourisia sessilifolia flowers from December to April and fruits from December to March.

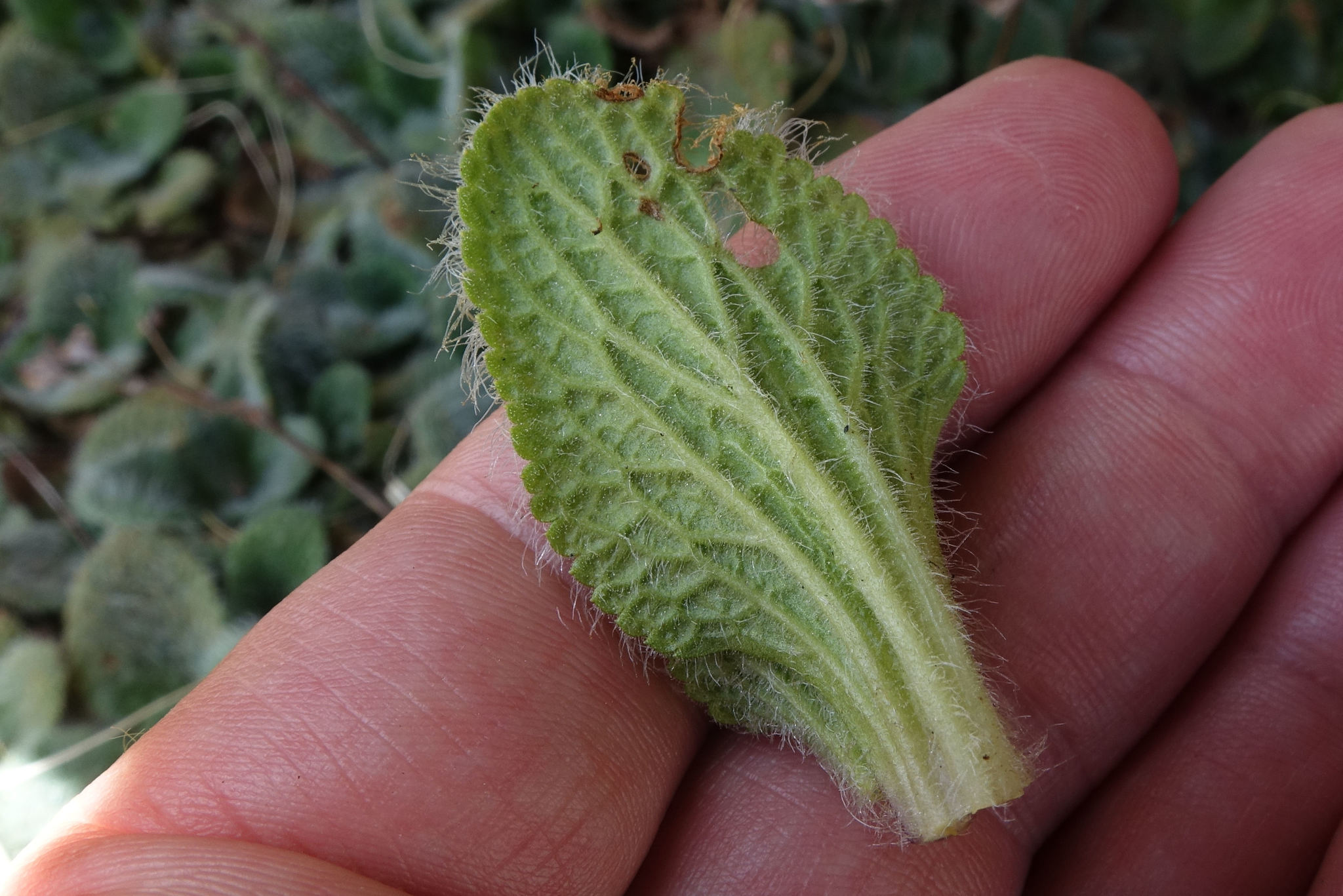
Close up of the underside of the leaf, showing glandular hairs that are much shorter than the non-glandular hairs

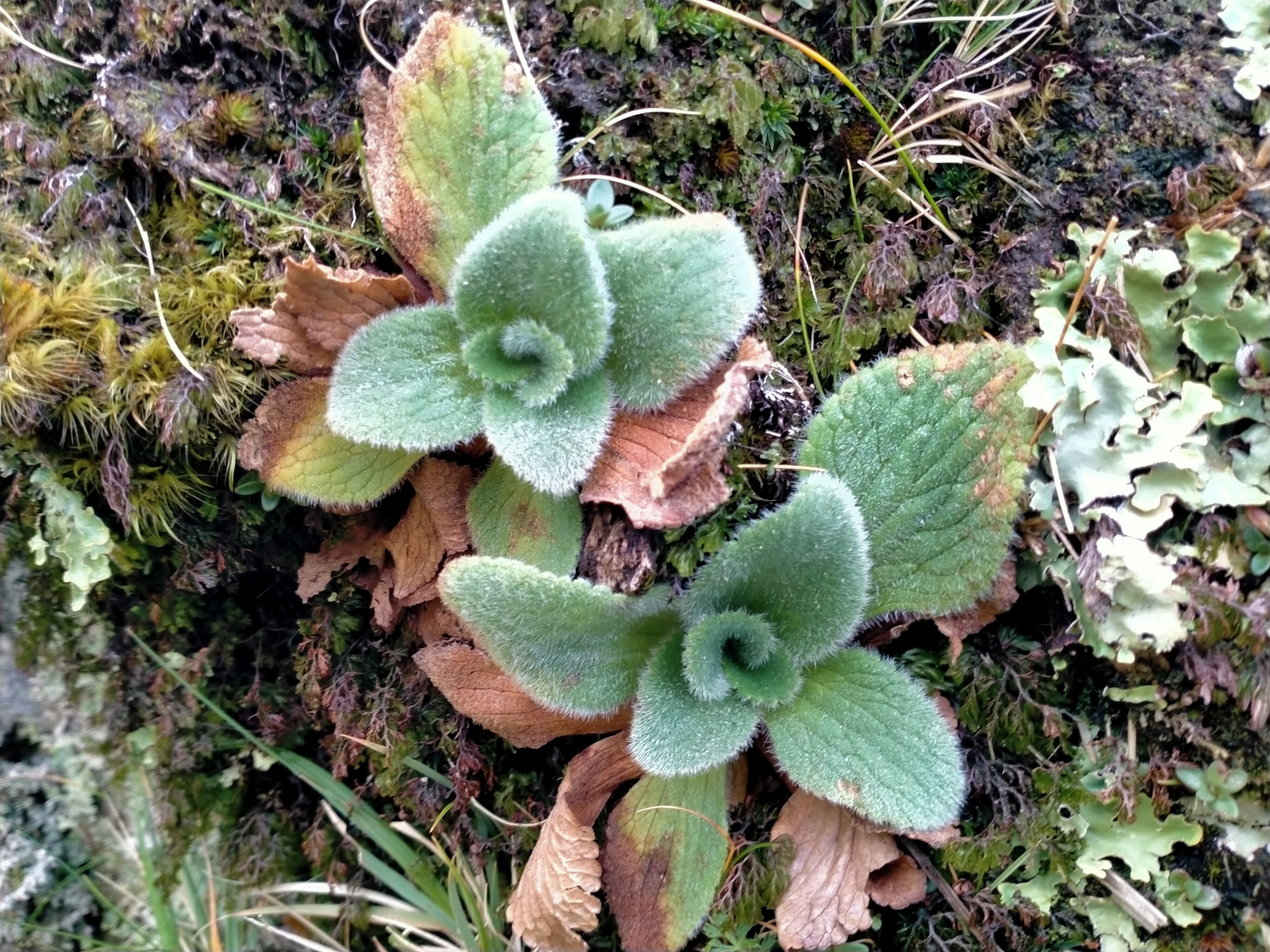
Close-up of rosettes of O. sessilifolia

The chromosome number of Ourisia sessilifolia is 2n=48.

== Distribution and habitat ==
Ourisia sessilifolia is a New Zealand mountain foxglove that is endemic to the South Island and Stewart Island of New Zealand. It is found throughout the South Island, in Western Nelson, Canterbury, Westland, Southland and Fiordland, as well as on Stewart Island, in high-elevation herbfields, meadows and grasslands in damp, shaded habitats near rocks, cliffs, and slopes from 800 to 2,100 m (2,600 to 6,900 ft) above sea level.

== Phylogeny ==
Two individuals of O. sessilifolia were included in phylogenetic analyses of all species of the genus Ourisia using standard DNA sequencing markers (two nuclear ribosomal DNA markers and two chloroplast DNA regions) and morphological data. In the nuclear and combined molecular analyses, the sampled individuals were sister to one another and belonged to the highly supported New Zealand lineage, but their placement was not well resolved within that clade in any of the trees.

In another phylogenetic study using amplified fragment length polymorphisms (AFLPs), all 17 sampled individuals formed a highly supported clade that was placed with strong support near O. simpsonii. The 17 sampled individuals of O. sessilifolia also comprised one of the significant clusters in the Bayesian clustering analysis.

== Conservation status ==
Ourisia sessilifolia is listed as Not Threatened in the most recent assessment (2017–2018) of the New Zealand Threatened Classification for plants.
