= Veronica chionohebe =

- Flowering Veronica chionohebe cushion

Conservation status
- Naturally Uncommon (NZ TCS)

Scientific classification
- Kingdom: Plantae
- Clade: Tracheophytes
- Clade: Angiosperms
- Clade: Eudicots
- Clade: Asterids
- Order: Lamiales
- Family: Plantaginaceae
- Genus: Veronica
- Species: V. chionohebe

Binomial name
- Veronica chionohebe Garn.-Jones

Synonyms
- Chionohebe glabra (Cheeseman) Heads; Veronica thomsonii var. glabra Cheeseman

Species of plant

Veronica chionohebe, one of the cushion snow hebes, is a species of flowering plant in the family Plantaginaceae. It is endemic to high elevation habitats of the mountains of Otago on the South Island of New Zealand, in snow banks and seepages. Thomas Cheeseman described Veronica thomsonii var. glabra which was later recognised by Michael Heads (as Chionohebe glabra in 1987) and Phil Garnock-Jones (as Veronica chionohebe in 2007) at the species level. The conservation status of V. chionohebe is At Risk - Naturally Uncommon.

== Taxonomy ==
Veronica chionohebe is in the plant family Plantaginaceae. New Zealand botanist Thomas Cheeseman described Veronica thomsonii var. glabra in his Manual of the New Zealand Flora in 1906. Michael Heads treated the species as Chionohebe glabra in 1987, but since 2007 it has been recognised as Veronica chionohebe by many botanists in a more broadly circumscribed Veronica.

The type specimen was collected on Mt Pisa, Otago, South Island, New Zealand, by Donald Petrie. The lectotype is at the herbarium the Auckland War Memorial Museum (AK 8335).

V. chionohebe is one of four cushion plants and six other small herbs or subshrubs in the snow hebe lineage. The distribution and location of hairs are important characters in distinguishing V. chionohebe from other snow hebe species. Veronica chionohebe is characterised by being nearly glabrous (without hairs) on most plant parts.

== Description ==
Veronica chionohebe plants are perennial cushions with a woody base.

== Distribution and habitat ==
Veronica chionohebe is endemic to the region of Otago, South Island, New Zealand, where it is only found in the Pisa Range, Carrick Range, Old Woman Range, and Garvie Mountains. Plants of this species can be found from 1380 to 1890m above sea level in alpine cushion herbfield or fellfield, often in late snow banks, hollows, gullies and seepages.

== Conservation status ==
Glabrous (hairless) cushion habit of V. chionohebe

According to the most recent (2023) New Zealand Threat Classification System (NZTCS), Veronica chionohebe is considered to be At Risk - Naturally Uncommon with the qualifiers "RR" (Range Restricted) and "Sp" (Biologically Sparse).
