= Veronica densifolia =

- Flowering Veronica densifolia plant from Ben Lomond, New Zealand

Conservation status
- Not Threatened (NZ TCS)

Scientific classification
- Kingdom: Plantae
- Clade: Tracheophytes
- Clade: Angiosperms
- Clade: Eudicots
- Clade: Asterids
- Order: Lamiales
- Family: Plantaginaceae
- Genus: Veronica
- Species: V. densifolia

Binomial name
- Veronica densifolia (F.Muell.) F.Muell.

Synonyms
- Paederota densifolia F.Muell.; Chionohebe densifolia (F.Muell.) B.G.Briggs & Ehrend.; Leonohebe densifolia (F.Muell.) Heads]]; Hebejeebie densifolia (F.Muell.) Heads]]; Logania tetragona Hook.f.; Veronica dasyphylla Kirk; Hebe dasyphylla (Kirk) Cockyane & Allan; Pygmea tetragona (Hook.f.) Ashwin; Veronica dasyphylla var. minor G.Simpson & J.S.Thomson; Veronica dasyphylla var. subacuta G.Simpson & J.S.Thomson

Species of flowering plant

Veronica densifolia, is a flowering plant in the family Plantaginaceae. It is a low-growing, spreading sub-shrub plant native to the South Island of New Zealand and New South Wales, Australia. Plants have pink, white or purple flowers.

== Description ==
Veronica densifolia is a small, tufted, perennial, decussate, prostrate shrub about 10 cm (3.9 in) high and about 20 cm (7.9 in) wide. The leaves mostly crowded, elliptic-shaped, about 5 mm (0.20 in) long, 2.5 mm (0.098 in) wide, margins with fine hairs, sessile and a blunt apex. The corolla white, pink or purple, 6–9 mm (0.24–0.35 in) long, calyx 4–6 mm (0.16–0.24 in) long and the lobes resembling leaves. Flowering occurs in summer and the fruit is an egg-shaped capsule about 4 mm (0.16 in) long, about 3 mm (0.12 in) wide, margins hairy and notched at the apex.

== Taxonomy and naming ==
Veronica densifolia is in the family Plantaginaceae. This was first formally described in 1855 by Ferdinand von Mueller who gave it the name Paederota densifolia in Definitions of rare or hithertoo undescribed Australian plants. In 1861, von Mueller transferred the species to the genus Veronica as V. densifolia in his Fragmenta phytographiae Australiae. The specific epithet (densifolia) means "thick" and "crowded" in reference to the leaves.

The type specimen was collected by von Mueller in Jan 1855 in the Munyang Mountains, Mt Kosciuszko, New South Wales, Australia. The lectotype is housed in the National Herbarium of Victoria (MEL 21502), and there are syntypes at the same herbarium, as well as the Royal Botanical Gardens, Kew.

Veronica densifolia is one of six small herbaceous plants or subshrubs together with four cushion plants in the snow hebe lineage of the genus Veronica. Together with V. ciliolata, it is one of two species in this lineage that is native to both New Zealand and Australia.

== Distribution and habitat ==
Veronica densifolia is native to both Australia and New Zealand. In New Zealand, it is found on the South Island, in the regions of Canterbury, Otago and Southland. In Australia, it is only found in Kosciuszko National Park in New South Wales. This species grows in alpine areas on stony, windy outcrops and boggy ground in low scrubland, herbfields, fellfield, cushion fields and grasslands. In Australia it is found from 1500 to 2240 m above sea level whereas in New Zealand it is found from 880 to 1980 m elevation.

== Conservation status ==
According to the most recent (2023) New Zealand Threat Classification System (NZTCS), Veronica densifolia is considered to be Not Threatened in New Zealand.

== Gallery ==
Flowering plant from Australia

Flowering cushion in Australia

Flowering plant in New Zealand

Close up of leaves and flower

Close up of leaves and fruit (capsule)

Close up of flowers

Habit
