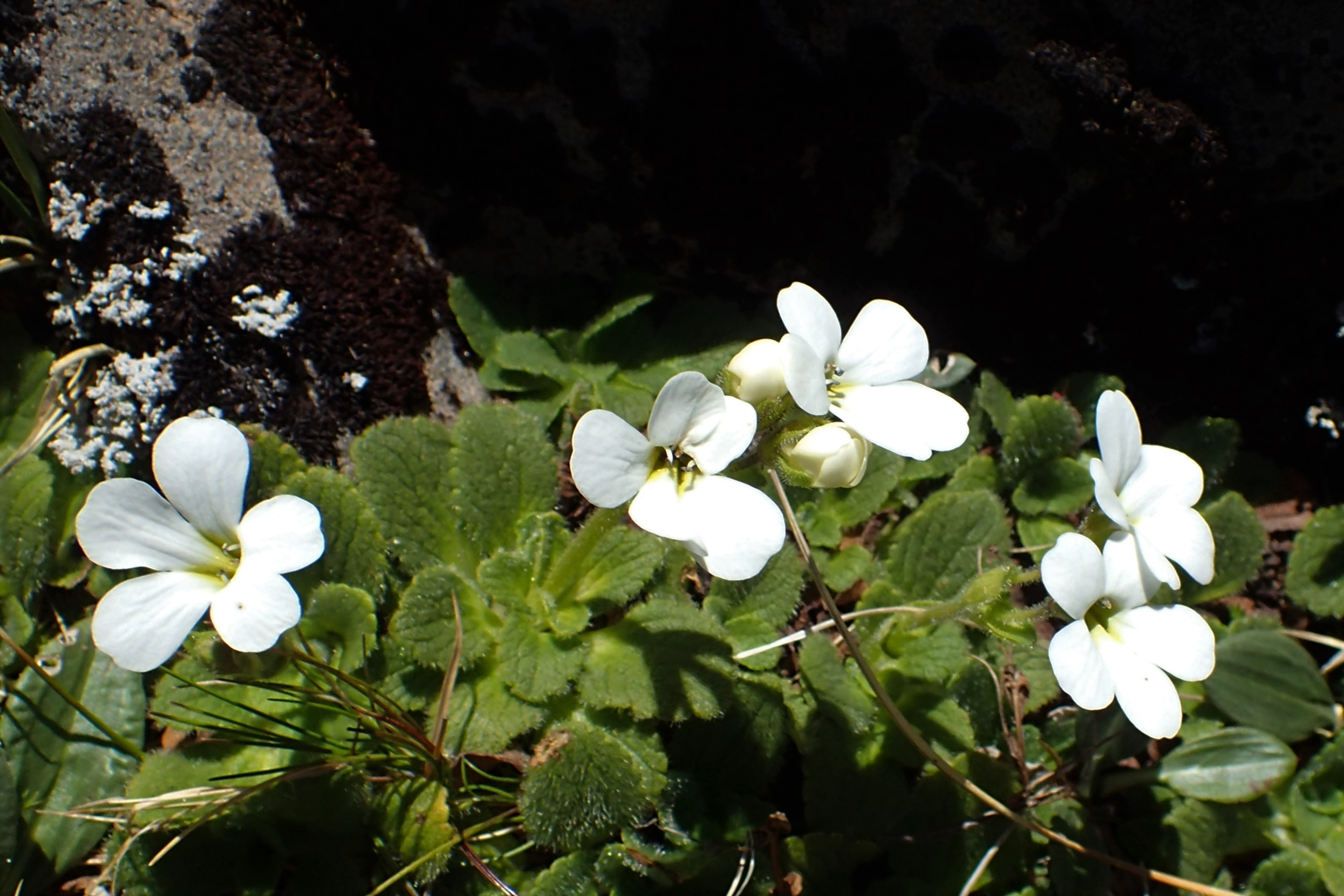
- Flowering O. simpsonii observed near Lewis Tops, Canterbury, South Island, New Zealand

Conservation status
- Not Threatened (NZ TCS)

Scientific classification
- Kingdom: Plantae
- Clade: Tracheophytes
- Clade: Angiosperms
- Clade: Eudicots
- Clade: Asterids
- Order: Lamiales
- Family: Plantaginaceae
- Genus: Ourisia
- Species: O. simpsonii

Binomial name
- Ourisia simpsonii (L.B.Moore) Arroyo

= Ourisia simpsonii =

Species of flowering plant

Ourisia simpsonii is a species of flowering plant in the family Plantaginaceae that is endemic to high-elevation habitats in the South Island of New Zealand. Mary Kalin Arroyo elevated O. simpsonii to species rank in 1984. Plants of this species of New Zealand mountain foxglove are perennial, small-leaved herbs that are covered in a mixture of long glandular and non-glandular hairs. They have hairy, crenate, ovate leaves that are in a basal rosette. The flowers are single or in pairs in each node, with a zygomorphic calyx and corolla. The corolla is white and the corolla tube is yellow and glabrous inside, and purple outside. It is listed as Not Threatened.

== Taxonomy ==
Ourisia simpsonii (L.B.Moore) Arroyo is in the plant family Plantaginaceae. Lucy Moore first described O. sessilifolia var. simpsonii L.B.Moore in 1961, and Mary Kalin Arroyo elevated it to species level as O. simpsonii in 1984 due to the numerous morphological differences that distinguish them.

The type material was collected by Robert Brockie at Mount Garfield in the South Island of New Zealand. The holotype is housed at the Allan Herbarium of Manaaki Whenua – Landcare Research, and there is an isotype at the herbarium of the Royal Botanic Gardens Kew.

Ourisia simpsonii is morphologically similar to other New Zealand small-leaved species, namely O. sessilifolia, with which it shares the subrosette or rosette habit, ovate to very broadly ovate or obovate to very broadly obovate leaves, irregular white corollas, and having a mixture of glandular and non-glandular hairs on many plant parts.

O. simpsonii can be distinguished from O. sessilifolia by irregular calyces (vs. regular), flowers and bracts in pairs only (vs. sometimes in whorls), glabrous and yellow corolla tubes (vs. 1 or 3 lines of hairs and purple), and long glandular hairs that are the same size as the non-glandular hairs (vs. glandular hairs that are much shorter than the non-glandular hairs).

== Description ==
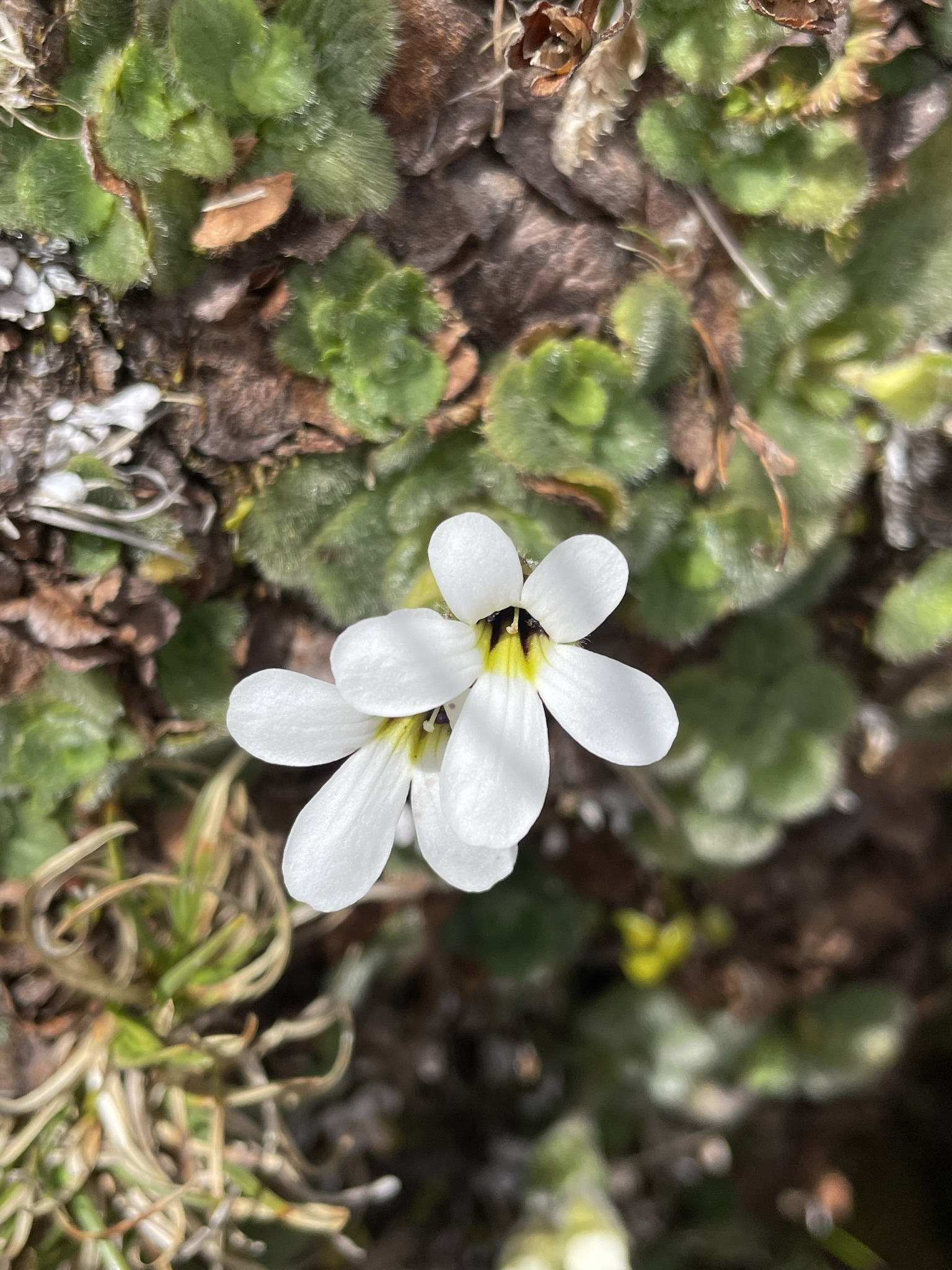
Close-up of flowers showing white corollas with corolla tubes that are glabrous and yellow inside, and purple outside near the base

Ourisia simpsonii plants are perennial herbs. The stems are creeping, with leaves that are opposite and tightly packed into rosettes or subrosettes. Leaf petioles are 3.3–17.3 mm long. Leaf blades are 6.8–30.4 mm long by 5.3–23.3 mm wide (length: width ratio 1.1–1.3: 1), ovate to very broadly ovate, or obovate to very broadly obovate, widest above or below the middle, with a rounded apex, cuneate base and regularly crenate edges. Leaves are densely hairy with a mixture of long glandular and non-glandular hairs on both surfaces, especially on the prominent veins on the lower surface, and punctate. Inflorescences are erect, with hairy racemes (sometimes densely hairy) up to 126 mm long, with a mixture of glandular and non-glandular hairs, and with 1–3 flowering nodes and up to 5 total flowers per raceme. Each flowering node has 1–2 flowers and 2 sessile, sometimes clasping bracts that are narrow to broadly obovate or oblanceolate. The lowest bracts are similar to the leaves, 7.5–11.4 mm long and 2.9–8.2 mm wide, and become smaller toward the apex of the raceme. The flowers are borne on a densely hairy pedicel that is up to 28.9 mm long and usually has a mixture of non-glandular and glandular hairs. The calyx is 5.7–8.7 mm long, irregular, with 3 lobes divided to one-third to one-half the length of the calyx and 2 divided to near the base, and often densely hairy with a mixture of glandular and non-glandular hairs. The corolla is 17.7–19.6 mm long (including the 4.9–11.7 mm long corolla tube), bilabiate, tubular-funnelform, glabrous and white to purplish on the outside, and glabrous and yellow on the inside. The corolla lobes are 5.4–11.3 mm long, spreading, and usually obovate and slightly emarginate. There are 4 stamens up to 9.2 mm long which are didynamous, with two long stamens reaching the corolla tube opening or exserted, and 2 short stamens included inside the corolla or reaching the corolla tube opening; a short staminode 0.3–1.3 mm long is also present. The style is 4.9–7.5 mm long, exserted or reaching the corolla tube opening, with an emarginate stigma. The ovary is 2.0–2.9 mm long and glabrous. Fruits are capsules c. 5.0 mm long and c. 4.3 mm wide with loculicidal dehiscence and pedicels up to 29.5 mm long. The number of seeds in each capsule is unknown, and seeds are 0.8–1.0 mm long and 0.5–0.7 mm long, with a two-layered, reticulate seed coat.

Ourisia simpsonii flowers from November to April and fruits from January to March.

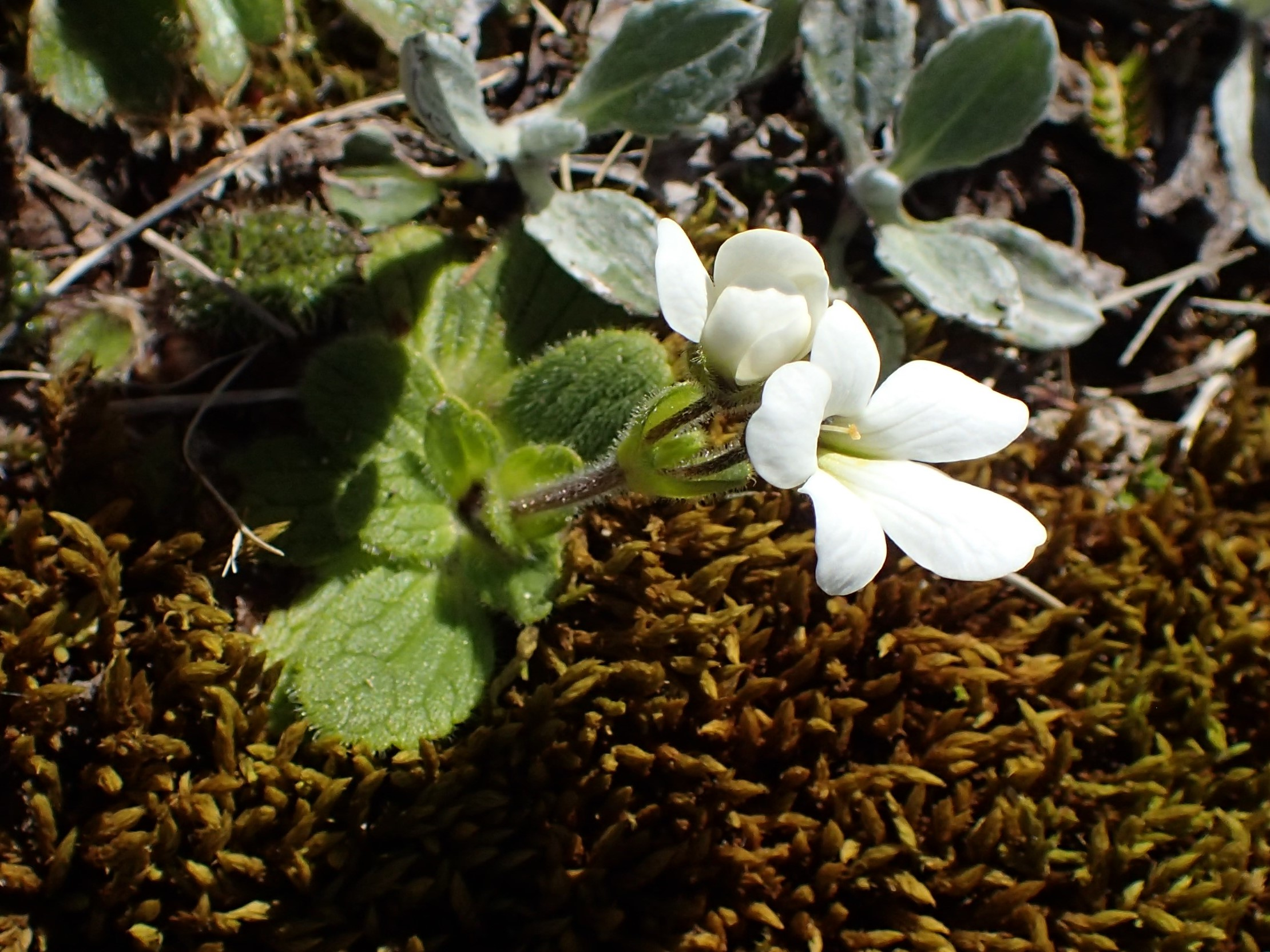
Flowering plant of O. simpsonii showing rosette habit and hairy leaves, peduncle and pedicel

The chromosome number of Ourisia simpsonii is 2n=48.

== Distribution and habitat ==
Ourisia simpsonii is a New Zealand mountain foxglove that is endemic to the South Island of New Zealand. It is found only in the northwestern regions of the South Island, namely Western Nelson, Canterbury and Westland in high-elevation herbfields and grasslands on cliffs, crevices and rocky areas, from 1,200 to 2,300 m (3,900 to 7,500 ft) above sea level.

== Phylogeny ==
An individual of O. simpsonii was included in phylogenetic analyses of all species of the genus Ourisia using standard DNA sequencing markers (two nuclear ribosomal DNA markers and two chloroplast DNA regions) and morphological data. In all analyses, the sampled individual belonged to the highly supported New Zealand lineage, but its placement was not well resolved within that clade.

In another phylogenetic study using amplified fragment length polymorphisms (AFLPs), all 16 sampled individuals formed a highly supported clade that was placed with strong support near O. sessilifolia. The 16 sampled individuals of O. simpsonii also comprised one of the significant clusters in the Bayesian clustering analysis.

== Conservation status ==
Ourisia simpsonii is listed as Not Threatened in the most recent assessment (2017–2018) of the New Zealand Threatened Classification for plants.
