= Veronica thomsonii =

- Flowering Veronica thomsonii cushion

Conservation status
- Not Threatened (NZ TCS)

Scientific classification
- Kingdom: Plantae
- Clade: Tracheophytes
- Clade: Angiosperms
- Clade: Eudicots
- Clade: Asterids
- Order: Lamiales
- Family: Plantaginaceae
- Genus: Veronica
- Species: V. thomsonii

Binomial name
- Veronica thomsonii

Synonyms
- Pygmea thomsonii Buchanan; Chionohebe thomsonii (Buchanan) B.G.Briggs & Ehrend.; Pygmea myosotoides Ashwin in Allan; Chionohebe myosotoides (Ashwin) B.G.Briggs & Ehrend.

Species of plant

Veronica thomsonii, one of the cushion snow hebes, is a species of flowering plant in the family Plantaginaceae.It is endemic to high elevation habitats of the mountains of Canterbury and Otago in the central and southern South Island of New Zealand, mostly east of the main divide. John Buchanan described Pygmea thomsonii in 1882, which was transferred to the genus Veronica in 1906 by Thomas Cheeseman. The conservation status of V. thomsonii is Not Threatened.

== Taxonomy ==
Veronica thomsonii is in the plant family Plantaginaceae. It was originally described as Pygmea thomsonii by John Buchanan in 1882. New Zealand botanist Thomas Cheeseman transferred the species to the genus Veronica in his Manual of the New Zealand Flora in 1906. The genus name Pygmea was described by Joseph Dalton Hooker in 1846, but it is an illegitimate name according to the International Code of Nomenclature for algae, fungi, and plants because a lichen genus called Pygmea had been described in 1809, so a new genus name was required. Australian botanist Barbara Briggs and Austrian botanist Friedrich Ehrendorfer transferred all species of Pygmea to the genus Chionohebe in 1987. Since 2007 the species has been recognised as Veronica thomsonii by many botanists in a more broadly circumscribed Veronica.

V. thomsonii is one of four cushion plants and six other small herbs or subshrubs in the snow hebe lineage. The distribution and location of hairs are important characters in distinguishing V. thomsonii from other snow hebe species. Veronica thomsonii is characterised by have leaves with a tight band of hairs on the middle part of the upper surface of the leaf.

== Description ==
Close-up image showing hairs on leaves of V. thomsonii

Veronica thomsonii plants are perennial cushions with a woody base. The leaves are hairy with a tight band of hairs on the upper surface of the leaf, as well as a tuft of hairs at the tip.

== Distribution and habitat ==
Veronica thomsonii is endemic the South Island of New Zealand, and is found in multiple mountain ranges from Canterbury to Otago including the Rock and Pillar Range. V. thomsonii is found in alpine habitats with other cushion species and herbs in rocky areas from 1200 to 2100 m above sea level and occasionally as high as 2440 m.

== Biochemistry ==
The water-soluble compounds that were isolated and identified from V. thomsoniii and another snow hebe species, V. pulvinaris, showed that the iridoid chemical profile of these species was different from other New Zealand Veronica species, and more similar to high-elevation species of Veronica from the northern hemisphere. The authors of that study hypothesized that the similar chemical profiles were the result of convergent or parallel evolution due to their similar alpine habitats. In addition, there were some unique compounds that could differentiate V. thomsonii and V. pulvinaris from one another. For example, V. thomsonii plants did not contain the iridoids mussaenoside and veronicoside, which were found in V. pulvinaris plants. In addition, for V. thomsonii, the main caffeoyl phenylethanoid glycosides are aragoside and isoaragoside derivatives whereas those for V. pulvinaris are persicoside- and isopersicoside-based metabolites.

== Conservation status ==
According to the most recent (2023) New Zealand Threat Classification System (NZTCS), Veronica thomsonii is considered to be Not Threatened.

== Gallery ==
Large cushion

Habit and habitat

Close-up of flowers

Flowering cushion
