= Margot Forde =

New Zealand botanist

Margot Bernice Forde
- Born: Margot Bernice Ashwin; 1 June 1935
- Died: 23 June 1992 (aged 57); Palmerston North, New Zealand
- Education: Victoria University College; University of California, Davis
- Occupations: Botanist, curator, taxonomist
- Known for: Plant taxonomies of Inner Mongolia
- Spouse: Bernard Forde

Margot Bernice Forde (née Ashwin; 1 June 1935 – 23 June 1992) was a New Zealand botanist, curator, and taxonomist.

== Biography ==
Forde was educated at Wellington Girls' College, and graduated from Victoria University College where she studied natural history and botany. She was married to fellow New Zealand botanist Bernard Forde, and they both received their PhD degrees from the Botany Department of the University of California, Davis in the early 1960s.

Margot Forde researched the plant taxonomies of Inner Mongolia, Xinjiang (China), and the Caucasus. She was a leading scientist in the field of seed conservation in grazing plants. She and her husband both did scientific work regarding climate change, with Forde building a scientific record with hundreds of samples of grasses from across New Zealand that provided evidence of climate change impacts, while Bernard worked to create New Zealand's climate laboratory in the early 1990s, attending an early international summit on the climate change in 1992 – the same year that Forde died from cancer.

== Publications ==
- Gardiner, S. E.; Forde, M. B.; Slack, C. R. (20 January 2012). "Grass cultivar identification by sodium dodecylsulphate polyacrylamide gel electrophoresis". New Zealand Journal of Agricultural Research. 29 (2): 193–206. doi:10.1080/00288233.1986.10426973.
- Aiken, Susan G.; Gardiner, Susan E.; Forde, Margot B. (October 1992). "Taxonomic implications of SDS-PAGE analyses of seed proteins in North American taxa of Festuca subgenus Festuca (Poaceae)". Biochemical Systematics and Ecology. 20 (7): 615–629. Bibcode:1992BioSE..20..615A. doi:10.1016/0305-1978(92)90019-A.
- Williams, A.I.; MacDonalds, I.R.; Forde, Margot Bernice (1962). "Variation of turpentine composition in five population samples of Pinus radiata". New Zealand Journal of Science (5): 486–495., ilus.
- Ashwin, Margot B. (1958). "Understanding plant names and their changes". Tuatara. 7 (2, December).

== Honours and awards ==
Forde was awarded the Allan Greenstone Award for meritorious service to botany and the Sesquicentennial Gold Medal for services to science in 1990. The Margot Forde Genebank at AgResearch, in Palmerston North, was named in her honour.

== Sources ==
- Royal Botanic Gardens, Kew. Ed. by R.K. Brummitt (1992). Authors of plant names : a list of authors of scientific names of plants, with recommended standard forms of their names, including abbreviations (Reprinted ed.). London: Royal Botanic Gardens. ISBN 978-0-947643-44-7.
- Zander (1984). Handwörterbuch der Pflanzennamen (13., neubearbeitete und erw. Aufl. ed.). Stuttgart: E. Ulmer. ISBN 3-8001-5042-5.
