= Friedrich Ehrendorfer =

Austrian botanist (1927–2023)

Friedrich Ehrendorfer (26 July 1927 – 28 November 2023) was an Austrian botanist who was professor emeritus of plant systematics at the Department of Botany and Biodiversity Research, University of Vienna. He was an honorary member of the American Academy of Arts and Sciences. For several years, he co-authored one of the leading university text-books in botany (Strasburger). Born in Vienna on 26 July 1927, he died in Vienna on 28 November 2023, at the age of 96.

The standard author abbreviation Ehrend. is used to indicate this person as the author when citing a botanical name.
