= Handbook of the New Zealand Flora =

1864–1867 book by Joseph Dalton Hooker

- Title page for Handbook of the New Zealand Flora (1867)
- Author: Joseph Dalton Hooker
- Subject: Botany
- Genre: Florae
- Publisher: L. Reeve & Co.
- Publication date: 1864, 1867

Handbook of the New Zealand Flora (abbreviated Handb. N. Zeal. Fl.) is a two volume work by English botanist Joseph Dalton Hooker with systematic botanical descriptions of plants native to New Zealand. The first part published in 1864 covers flowering plants, and the second part published in 1867 covers Hepaticae, mosses, lichens, fungi and algae.
