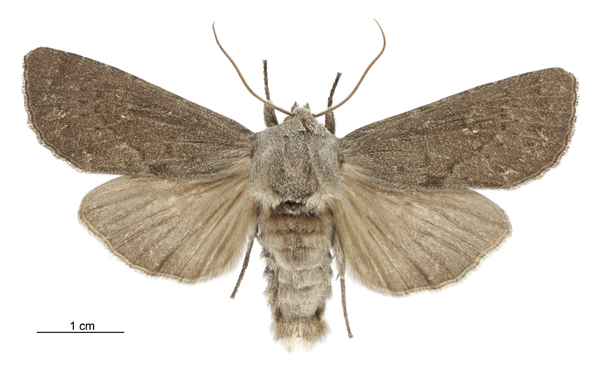
- Male
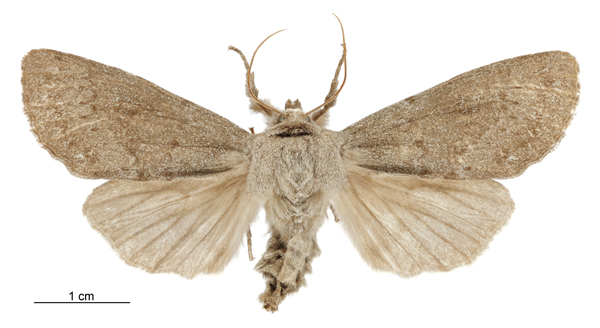
- Female

Scientific classification
- Kingdom: Animalia
- Phylum: Arthropoda
- Clade: Pancrustacea
- Class: Insecta
- Order: Lepidoptera
- Superfamily: Noctuoidea
- Family: Noctuidae
- Genus: Ichneutica
- Species: I. nullifera

Binomial name
- Ichneutica nullifera (Walker, 1857)

Synonyms
- Agrotis nullifera Walker, 1857; Alysia specifica Guenee, 1868; Graphania nullifera (Walker, 1857); Aletia nullifera Walker, 1857

= Ichneutica nullifera =

Species of moth

Ichneutica nullifera is a moth of the family Noctuidae. This species is endemic to New Zealand and can be found in the Tongariro National Park, along the Wellington coast and throughout the South Island. The adults are large and the forewing of adults can vary in colour from pale fawn to dark grey. The larvae are coloured a bright yellow-brown with a paler underside. The larval host species are in the genus Aciphylla and as a result the adult moths are often found in habitat dominated by species in this genus. Adults are on the wing from November to early April and are sometimes attracted to light.

== Taxonomy ==
This species was first described by Francis Walker in 1857 using a specimen collected in Waikouaiti by Mr P. Earl. In 1988 J. S. Dugdale placed this species within the Graphania genus. In 2019 Robert Hoare undertook a major review of New Zealand Noctuidae. During this review the genus Ichneutica was greatly expanded and the genus Graphania was subsumed into that genus as a synonym. As a result of this review, this species is now known as Ichneutica nullifera. The holotype specimen is held at the Natural History Museum, London.

== Description ==
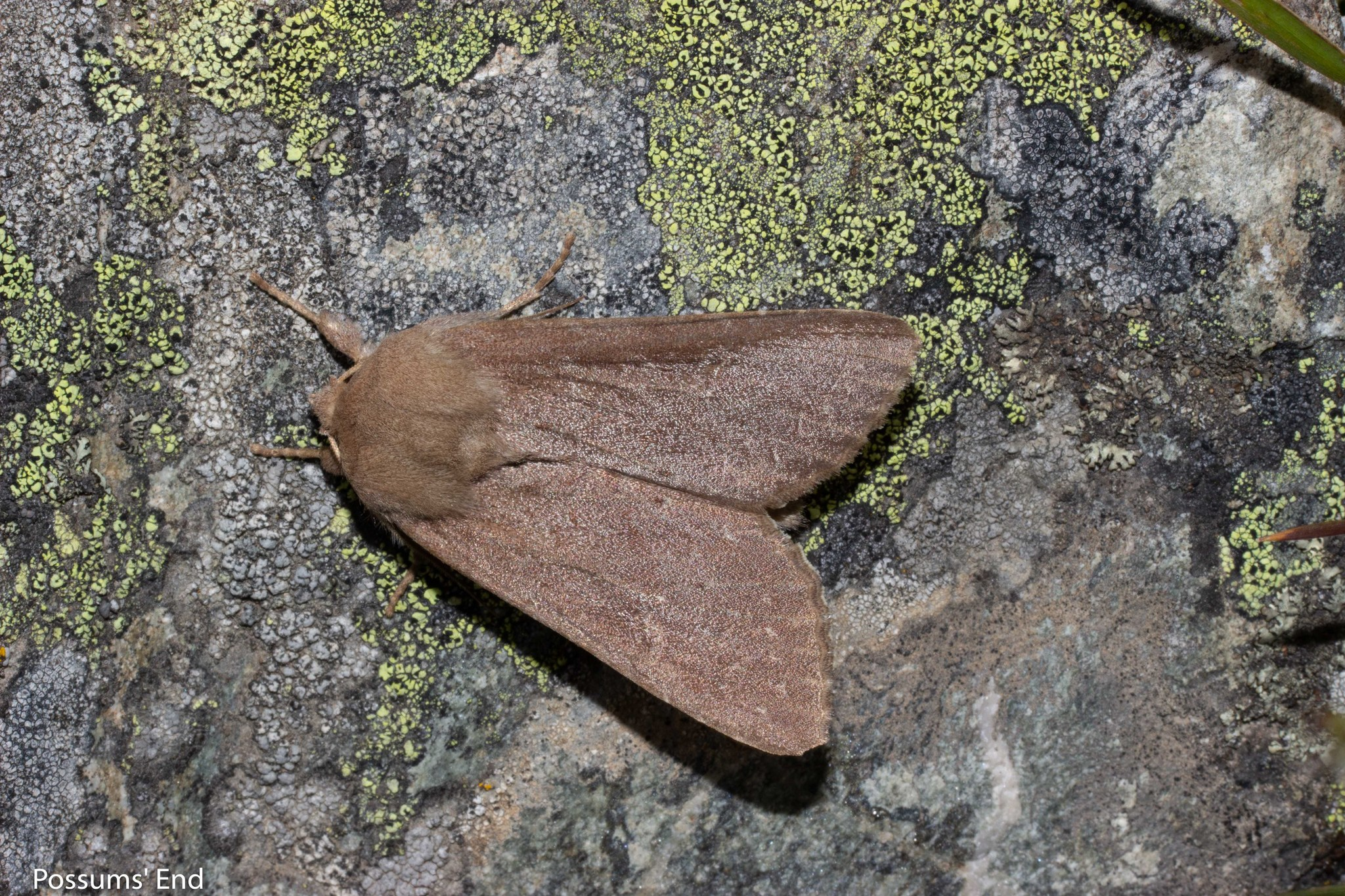
Ichneutica nullifera, deep fawn forewing colouration

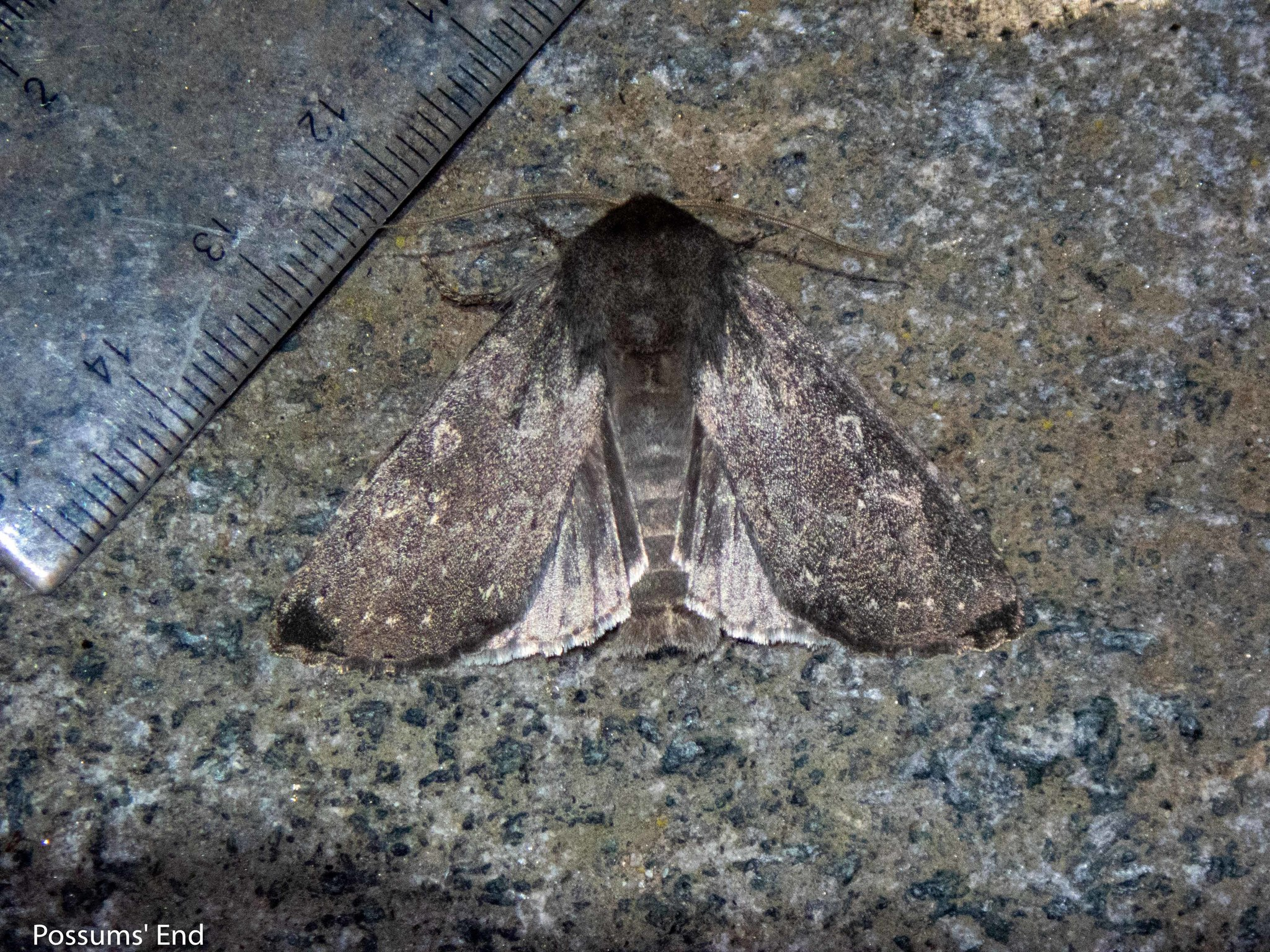
Ichneutica nullifera, dark greyish forewing colouration

Walker described the male adult of this species as follows:

Male. Pale fawn-colour. Abdomen very pale. Antennae serrated. Fore wings without any marks, excepting an indistinct darker dot on each of the exterior veins. Hind wings very pale fawn-colour, shining. Length of the body 10 lines; of the wings 24 lines.

Hudson in his 1928 book The butterflies and moths of New Zealand described the larva of this species as follows:

The larva is very stout, bright yellowish-brown, considerably paler on the undersurface; the dorsal line is faintly indicated, the subdorsal and lateral lines are dull brown, with a chain of elongate white spots beneath each; the spiracles and dorsal surface of the posterior segments are black; there are also numerous white dots all over the larva.

I. nullifera is large in size with the male of the species having a wingspan of 53 to 67 mm and the female having a wingspan of between 57 and 77 mm. The forewing colouration of specimens can vary from deep fawn to a dark grey. Of this species near relatives, I. nobilia is the most similar in appearance, but can be distinguished as a result of the deep greyish-blue sheen on that species' forewings.

== Distribution ==
It is endemic to New Zealand. I. nullifera can be found in the Tongariro National Park, along the Wellington coast, and throughout the South Island.

== Habitat ==
This species tends to prefer a habitat where its host species flourish.

== Behaviour ==
The adults of this species is sometimes attracted to light and have been collected via a mercury vapour light trap. The adults are on the wing from November to early April.

== Life history and host species ==
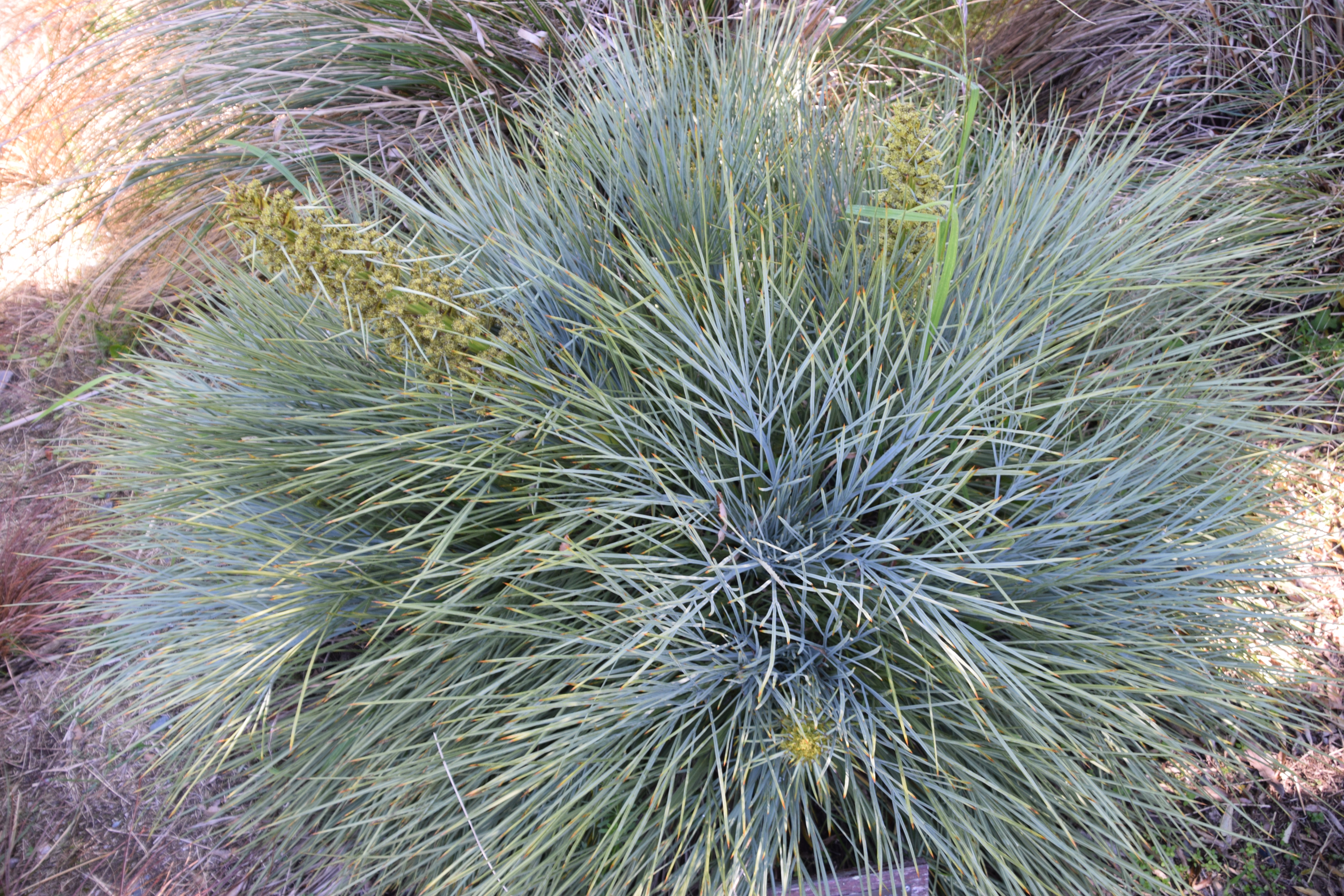
Aciphylla squarrosa, one of the host species of I. nullifera

The larvae of this species feeds on Aciphylla species including Aciphylla aurea, Aciphylla colensoi, Aciphylla glaucescens, Aciphylla squarrosa, Aciphylla subflabellata. The larvae prefers the softer centre of the plant and its presence can be detected by the frass it produces as well as the discolouration it causes by feeding near the base of the leaves. The larvae are often found in burrows in the stem of the host plant. The pupa, which is in a loose cocoon, can be found in the leaf litter near the roots of the host plant.
