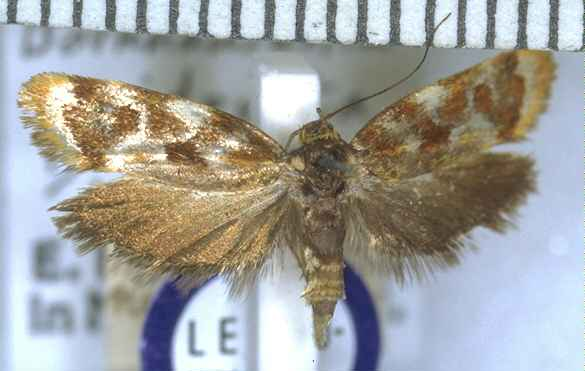
- Female lectotype

Scientific classification
- Kingdom: Animalia
- Phylum: Arthropoda
- Class: Insecta
- Order: Lepidoptera
- Family: Oecophoridae
- Genus: Tingena
- Species: T. siderota

Binomial name
- Tingena siderota (Meyrick, 1888)

Synonyms
- Cremnogenes siderota Meyrick, 1888; Borkhausenia siderota (Meyrick, 1888)

= Tingena siderota =

Species of moth, endemic to New Zealand

Tingena siderota is a species of moth in the family Oecophoridae. It is endemic to New Zealand and has been observed at Mount Arthur, Arthur's Pass and in the Hawkes Bay. The adults of this species are on the wing in January and are said to be abundant on the flowers of species in the genus Aciphylla.

== Taxonomy ==
This species was first described in 1888 by Edward Meyrick using specimens collected on Mount Arthur in January. Meyrick originally named this species Cremnogenes siderota. In 1915 Meyrick placed this species within the Borkhausenia genus. In 1926 Alfred Philpott studied and illustrated the genitalia of the male of this species. George Hudson discussed and illustrated this species under the name B. siderota in his 1928 publication The butterflies and moths of New Zealand. In 1988 Dugdale placed this species in the genus Tingena. The female lectotype is held at the Natural History Museum, London.

== Description ==
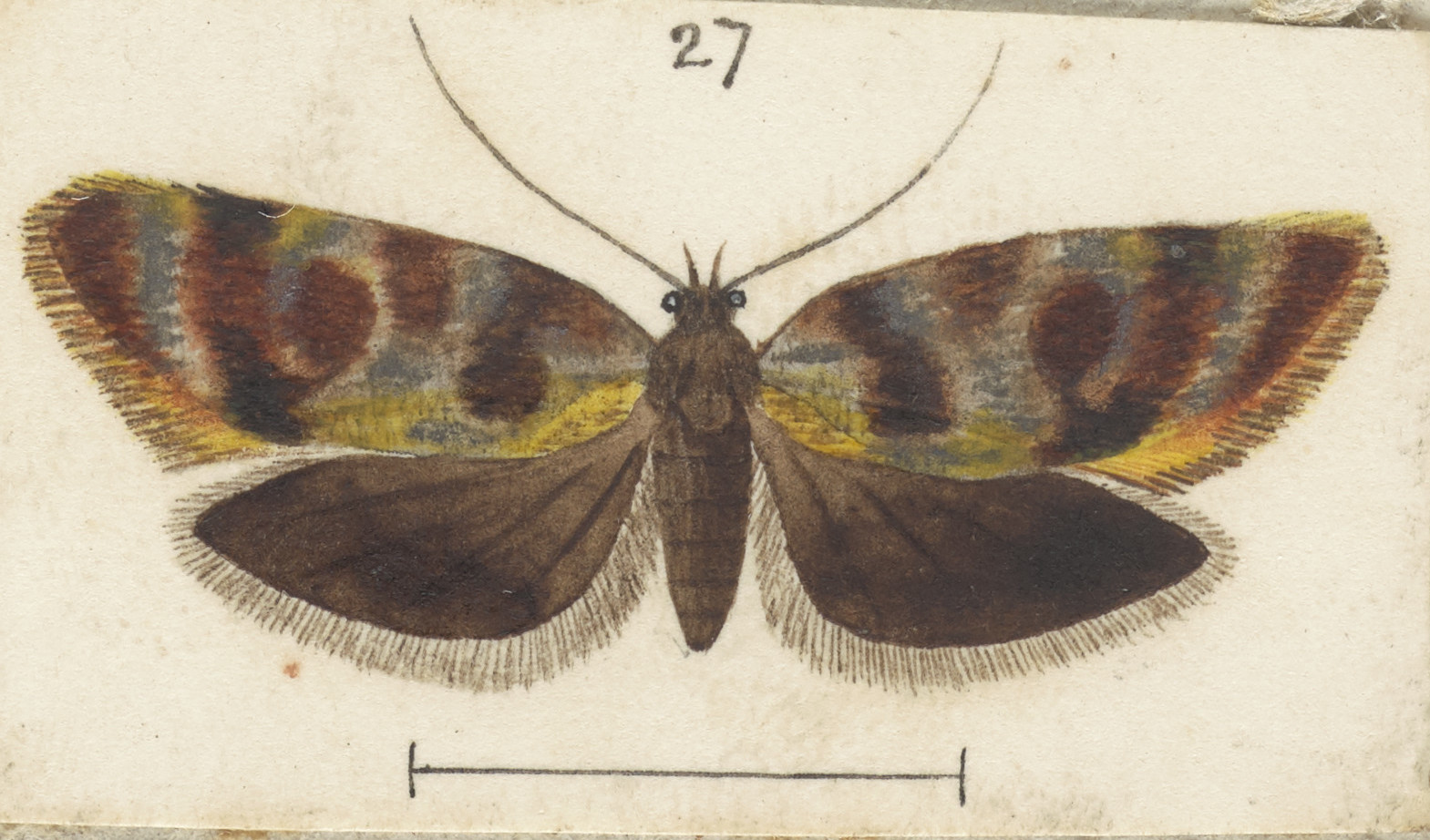
Illustration of T. siderota by George Hudson.

Meyrick described this species as follows:

Male, female.—16–18 mm. Head, palpi, antennæ, thorax, abdomen, and legs dark fuscous; collar ferruginous; antennæ in male clothed throughout with scattered cilia (1), with longer fasciculated series (2); patagia with small ochreous-whitish apical spot. Forewings elongate, costa moderately arched, apex obtuse, hindmargin rounded, rather strongly oblique; deep ferruginous, more or less irrorated and suffused with dark grey, especially in male; a small ill-defined yellowish spot on base of inner margin, and another beyond middle, in female much more distinct than in male; two pale leaden-grey-metallic irregular angulated transverse lines, first about 1/5, second about 1/3, second in female forming a whitish-ochreous triangular spot on costa; a pale leaden-grey-metallic ring in disc beyond middle; a pale leaden-grey-metallic line from costa near before apex to anal angle, slightly bent in middle, extremities forming whitish-ochreous spots, more distinct in female: cilia dark grey, basal half light ferruginous, with a pale yellowish spot beneath anal angle. Hindwings dark fuscous-grey; cilia grey, with a darker basal line.

This species can be distinguished from its close relatives because of its brilliant colour and the leaden-metallic fasciae.

== Distribution ==
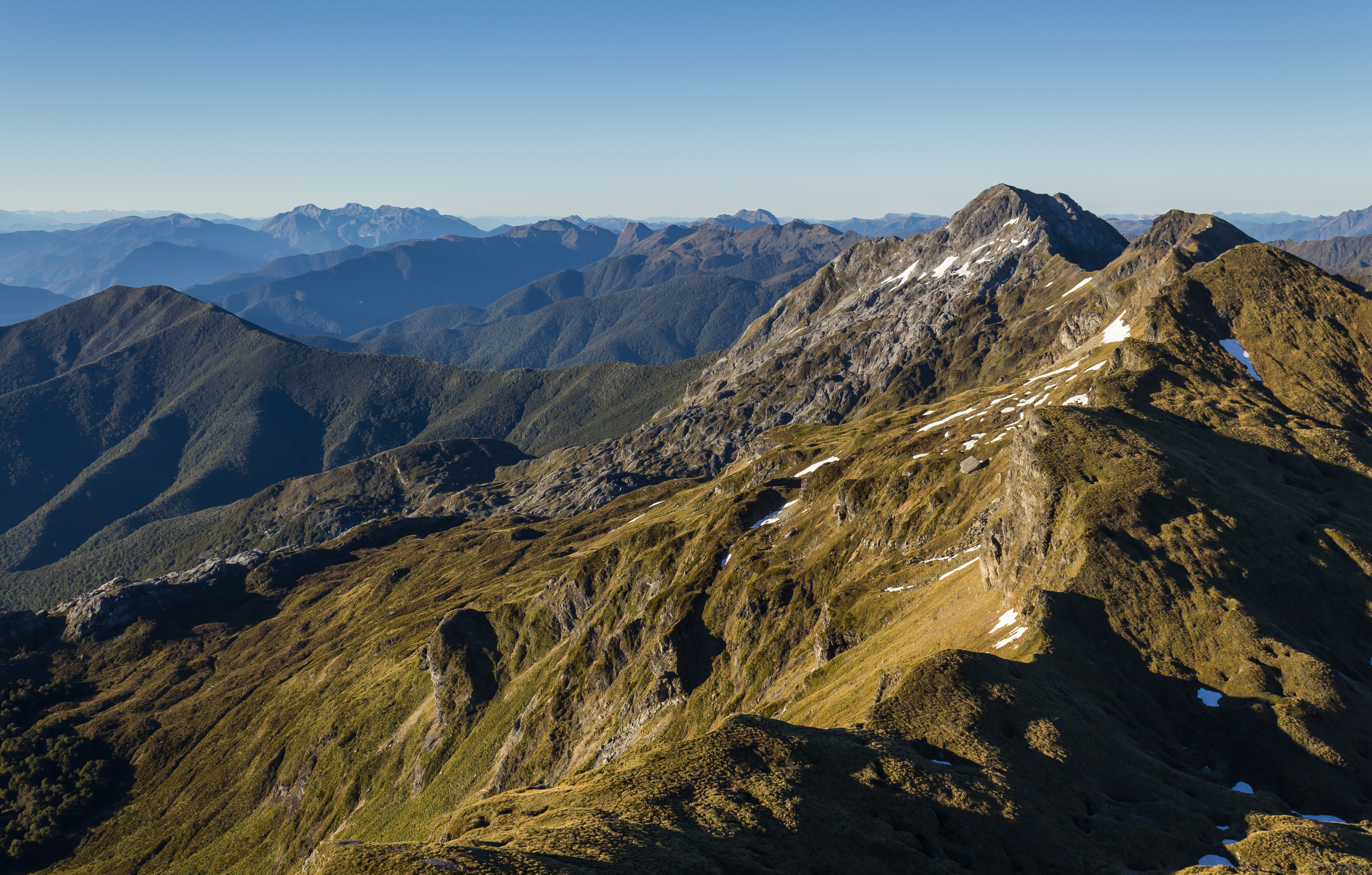
Mount Arthur, type locality of T. siderota.

This species is endemic to New Zealand and has been observed at its type locality of Mount Arthur as well as Arthur's Pass. This species has also been observed in the Hawkes Bay. It is regarded as being a rare species.

== Behaviour ==
The adults of this species are on the wing in January.

== Habitat ==
This species has been collected at altitudes of around 4500 ft and is said to be abundant on the flowers of Aciphylla.
