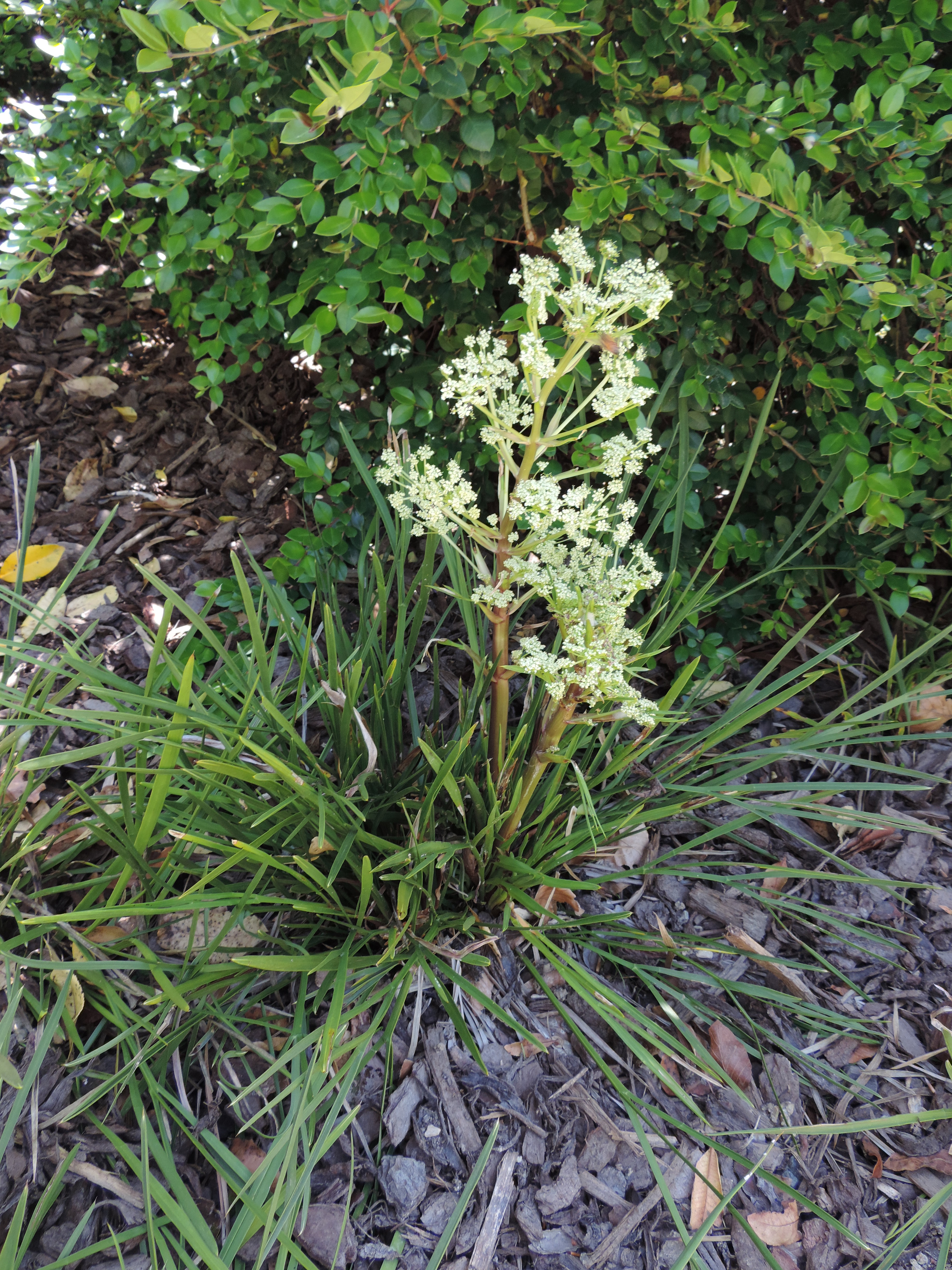

Scientific classification
- Kingdom: Plantae
- Clade: Tracheophytes
- Clade: Angiosperms
- Clade: Eudicots
- Clade: Asterids
- Order: Apiales
- Family: Apiaceae
- Genus: Aciphylla
- Species: A. traversii

Binomial name
- Aciphylla traversii (F.Muell.) Hook.f.

Synonyms
- Gingidium traversii F.Muell.; Angelica traversii Hook.f.

= Aciphylla traversii =

Species of plant

Aciphylla traversii, commonly known as taramea, Chatham Island speargrass or Chatham Island Spaniard, is a species of Aciphylla endemic to the Chatham Islands.

== Description ==
This stout perennial herb can grow anywhere between 25 cm (9.8 in) and 1 m (3 ft 3 in).

It produces slender but sturdy stems up to 5 cm (2.0 in) in diameter.

It has numerous dark green (or brown green) leaves with white to yellow smooth margins. They are 15–75 cm (5.9–29.5 in) long and rather droopy.

All parts of the plant bleed a yellow resin when damaged.

It flowers from November to February, and fruits from January to June. The male flowers are creamy white, and the female flowers are greenish or pale yellow.

Its stout and rigid flowering stems are up to 1 m (3 ft 3 in) by 0.4 m (1 ft 4 in). Their outer layers are fibrous, with a white pithy centre. They last until after the seeds have dispersed - the centre becomes hollow, and the outer layer eventually breaks into fibrous pieces.

== Distribution ==
Aciphylla traversii is one of two species of Aciphylla found in the Chatham Islands. It is found on the Rekohu (Chatham) and Rangihaute (Pitt) Islands, and may have previously been found on the Mang’ere Island.

It can be found in or on the edge of peat bogs and peat lakes, and in sandy or peaty soils.

== Conservation ==
As of 2023, its conservation status was assessed as "At Risk – Declining".

It is at threat from browsing domestic stock and feral mammals, along with rodents and possums that target the seeds, seedlings, and flowers. It is also at risk of being shaded out by other shrubs and trees.
