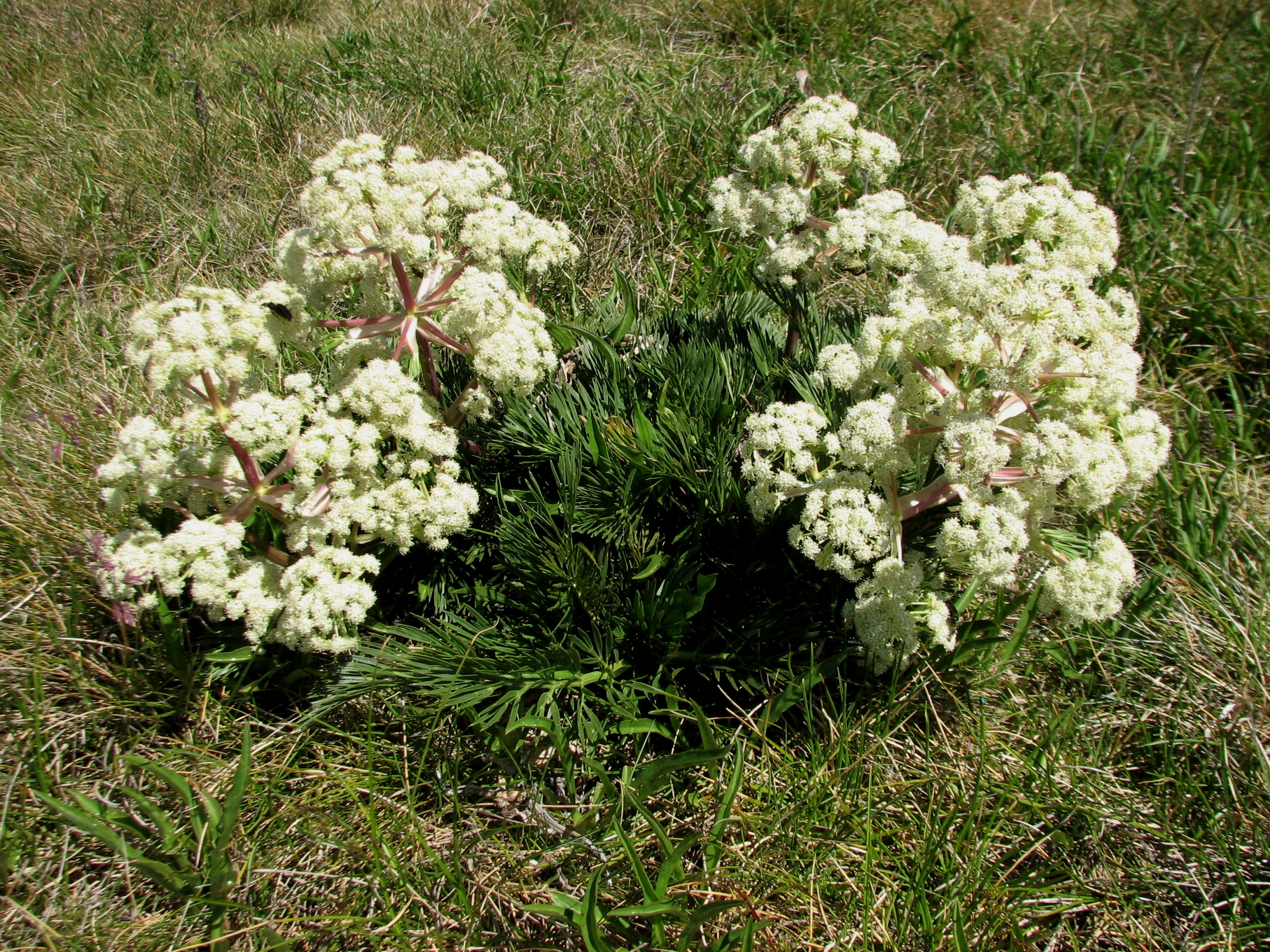
- In flower at Mount Hotham, Victoria

Scientific classification
- Kingdom: Plantae
- Clade: Tracheophytes
- Clade: Angiosperms
- Clade: Eudicots
- Clade: Asterids
- Order: Apiales
- Family: Apiaceae
- Genus: Aciphylla
- Species: A. glacialis

Binomial name
- Aciphylla glacialis (F.Muell.) Benth.

Synonyms
- Gingidium glaciale F.Muell.

= Aciphylla glacialis =

Species of flowering plant

Aciphylla glacialis, commonly known as snow aciphyll or mountain celery, is a tufted perennial herb that is found in mountainous regions of south-eastern Australia.

== Description ==
It is stout, with a robust root, and reaches 25–60 cm high. Its leaves are stiff, 10–30 cm long, and 4–9 cm wide.

It flowers in the summer to produce 2.5–3 mm diameter blooms. Its fruit are 5.5–10.5 mm long and 2–3 mm wide.

== Distribution ==
It is native to the temperate regions of New South Wales and Victoria. It is common in tussock grassland and tall herbfields in alpine to subalpine regions. It is occasionally found in snow-gum woodland. It is eaten by grazing animals, and so rare in farmed areas.

== Taxonomy ==
The species was first formally described in 1855 by Victorian Government Botanist Ferdinand von Mueller as Gingidium glaciale. In 1867, the species was transferred to the genus Aciphylla and given its current name by English botanist George Bentham in Flora Australiensis. It occurs in Victoria and New South Wales.
