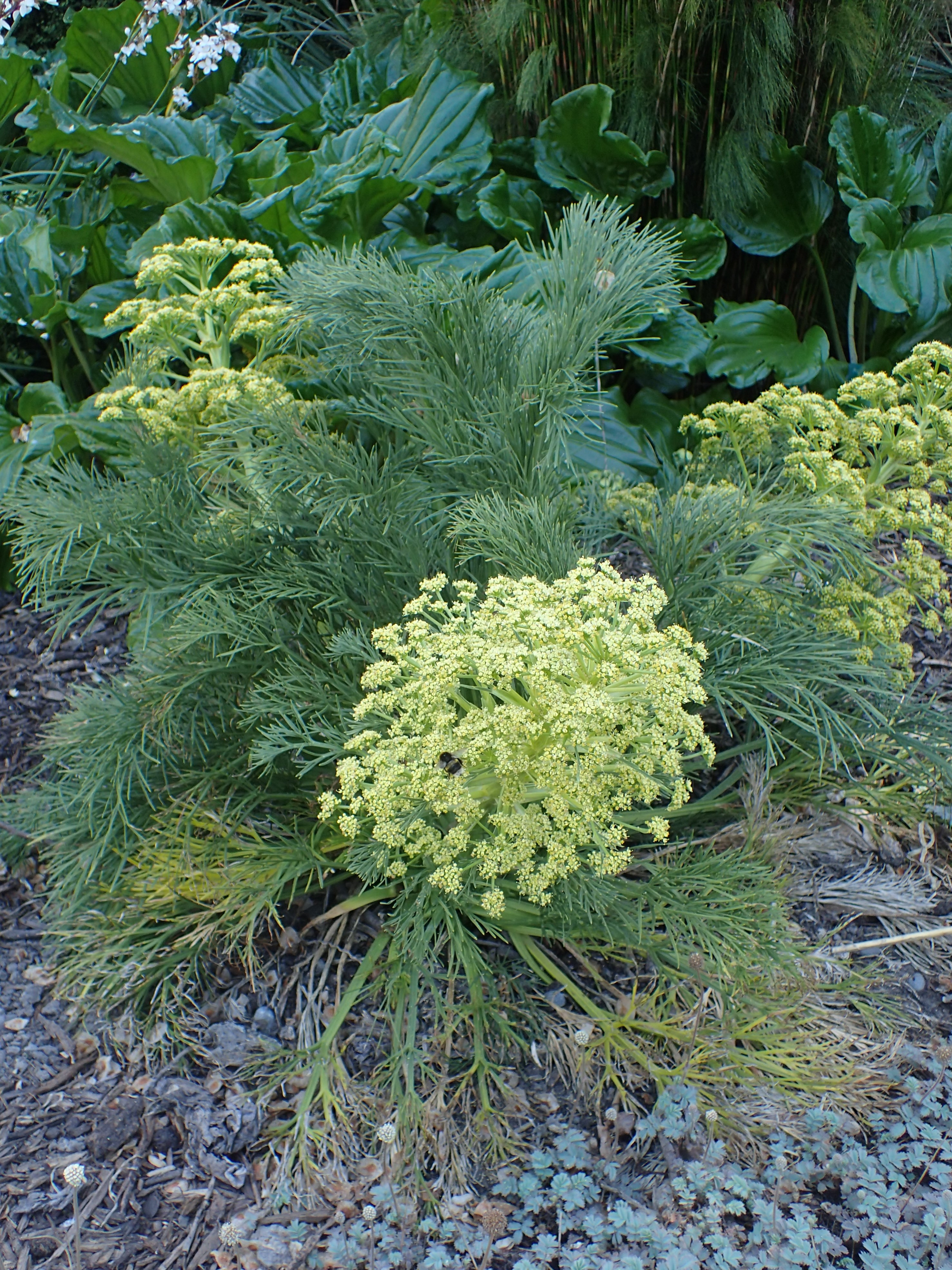
- Aciphylla dieffenbachii in the Christchurch Botanic Gardens

Scientific classification
- Kingdom: Plantae
- Clade: Tracheophytes
- Clade: Angiosperms
- Clade: Eudicots
- Clade: Asterids
- Order: Apiales
- Family: Apiaceae
- Genus: Aciphylla
- Species: A. dieffenbachii

Binomial name
- Aciphylla dieffenbachii (F.Muell) Kirk

Synonyms
- Angelica dieffenbachii (F.Muell.) Benth. & Hook.f.; Coxella dieffenbachii (F.Muell.) Cheeseman & Hemsl.; Gingidium dieffenbachii F.Muell.; Ligusticum dieffenbachii Hook.f.

= Aciphylla dieffenbachii =

Species of plant

Aciphylla dieffenbachii, also called soft speargrass or Dieffenbach's speargrass, is a species of soft speargrass endemic to the Chatham Islands.

== Description ==
It is a small perennial with clusters of soft and drooping leaves that divide into blue-green leaflets up to 0.7 m (2 ft 4 in) long. It produces a striking upright flowering stem up to 1 m (3 ft 3 in) tall. From November to February it produces yellow flowers, and from January to June it produces a golden-yellow fruit that turns a light brown-grey when mature. It has a robust and deep taproot. If damaged, it will bleed a sticky white latex fluid.

== Distribution ==
It is endemic to the Chatham Islands. Within the Chathams, it has been found on the Chatham, Pitt, Mangere, Little Mangere, and South East (Rangatira) islands, along with some of the Murumuru stacks and islets. It is found solely in coastal areas.

It has also been cultivated, and can be found in gardens on mainland New Zealand.

== Taxonomy ==
Aciphylla dieffenbachii is named after Johann Karl Ernest Dieffenbach, a German physician, geologist and naturalist. Dieffenbach worked for the New Zealand Company and travelled widely across the country.

== Conservation status ==
As of 2023, it was classified as At Risk – Declining.
