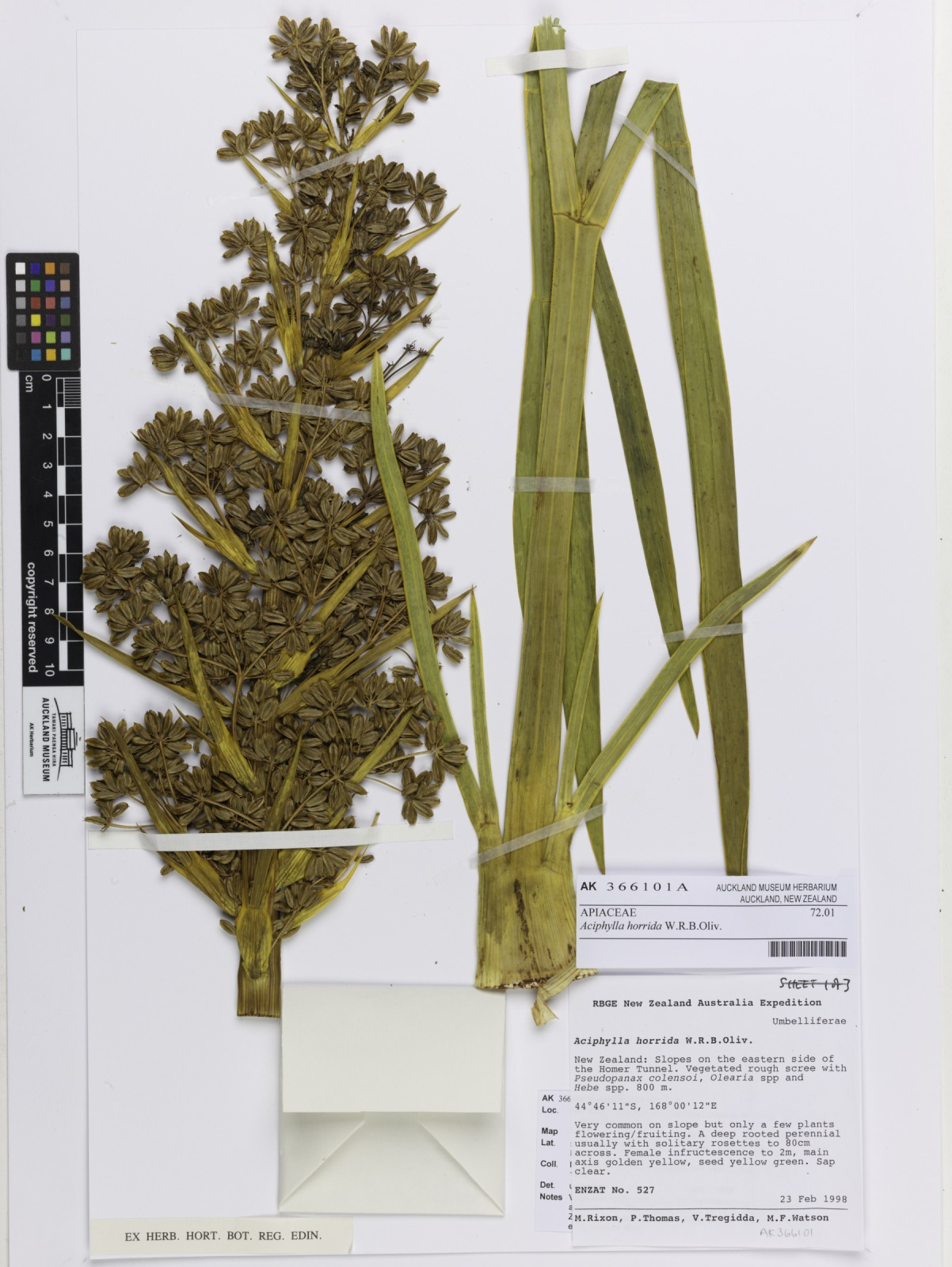

Conservation status
- Not Threatened (NZ TCS)

Scientific classification
- Kingdom: Plantae
- Clade: Embryophytes
- Clade: Tracheophytes
- Clade: Angiosperms
- Clade: Eudicots
- Clade: Asterids
- Order: Apiales
- Family: Apiaceae
- Genus: Aciphylla
- Species: A. horrida

Binomial name
- Aciphylla horrida W.R.B.Oliv

= Aciphylla horrida =

Species of plant

Aciphylla horrida is a species of Aciphylla, commonly known as giant speargrass, native to New Zealand.

== Description ==
It is a large perennial herb, growing up to 1 m (3 ft 3 in) tall. It can be found as a single clump, or in a small group.

Its leaves are bright green and up to approximately 80 cm (31 in) long. Its flowering stem is stout and approximately 150 cm (59 in) tall. From November to January, this stem will produce numerous small flowers. It produces 4 mm (0.16 in) fruit from December to February.

== Distribution ==
Aciphylla horrida is endemic to the South Island of New Zealand. It is found southwards of Mount Uriah and prefers higher rainfall areas, so it is more common on the western side of the Southern Alps.

It grows in sub-alpine to low-alpine climates, and is common in areas where snow tussock is mixed with scrub or herbfield.

== Conservation status ==
As of 2023, its conservation status was Not Threatened.

== Related species ==
Aciphylla aff. horrida, also known by the tag name Aciphylla "Lomond", is an undescribed species of Aciphylla also endemic to New Zealand.

Collections have been made from the Otago and Southland districts.
