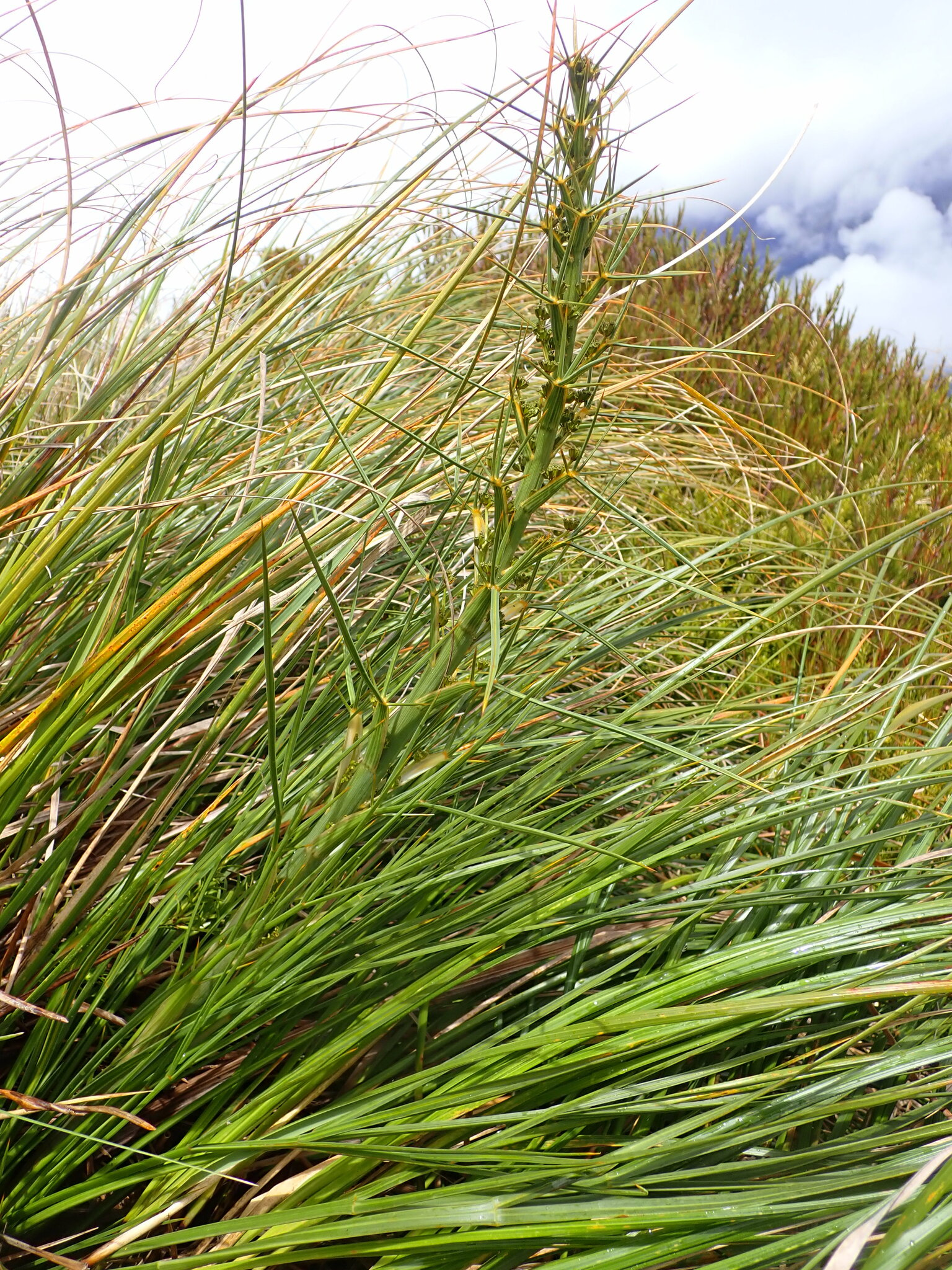

Scientific classification
- Kingdom: Plantae
- Clade: Tracheophytes
- Clade: Angiosperms
- Clade: Eudicots
- Clade: Asterids
- Order: Apiales
- Family: Apiaceae
- Genus: Aciphylla
- Species: A. takahea

Binomial name
- Aciphylla takahea W.R.B.Oliv

= Aciphylla takahea =

Species of plant

Aciphylla takahea is a species of Aciphylla native to New Zealand.

== Description ==
It is a perennial herb.

The leaves of male plants are 25 cm (9.8 in) long, while female plants have longer leaves of roughly 40 cm (16 in).

== Distribution ==
It is endemic to the South Island of New Zealand, and grows primarily in subalpine or subarctic areas.

== Conservation ==
As of 2023, its conservation status was assessed as "At Risk – Declining".

== Taxonomy ==
It takes its name from the location in which the type specimen was collected, in the Takahe Valley (Murchison Range, New Zealand).
