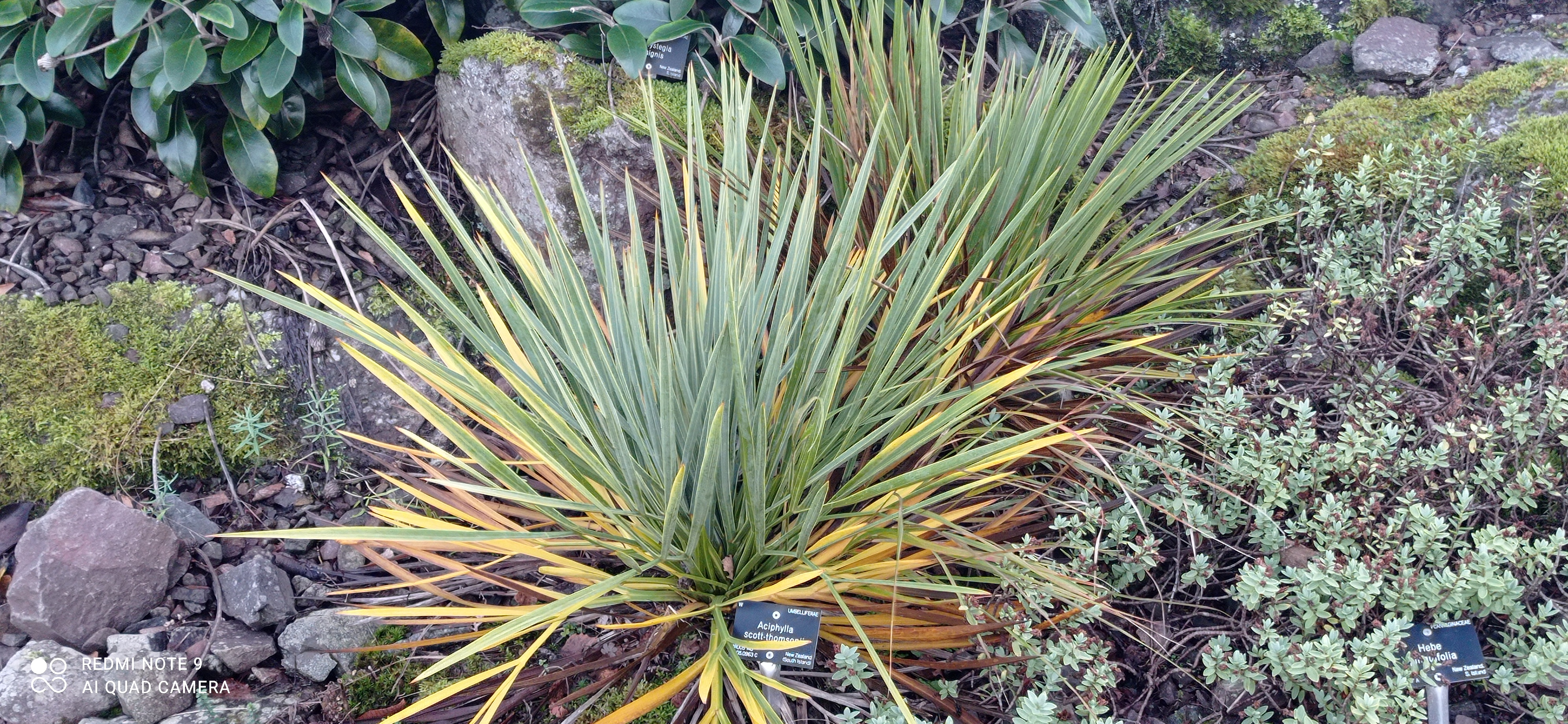

Scientific classification
- Kingdom: Plantae
- Clade: Tracheophytes
- Clade: Angiosperms
- Clade: Eudicots
- Clade: Asterids
- Order: Apiales
- Family: Apiaceae
- Genus: Aciphylla
- Species: A. scott-thomsonii

Binomial name
- Aciphylla scott-thomsonii Cockayne & Allan

= Aciphylla scott-thomsonii =

Species of plant

Aciphylla scott-thomsonii, also called giant speargrass or taramea, is a species of Aciphylla native to New Zealand.

== Description ==
This herb forms large tussocks up to or exceeding 3 m (9.8 ft) high, with leaves 1.5 m (4 ft 11 in) in length.

It produces yellow flowers.

== Distribution ==
It is endemic to the South Island of New Zealand. It usually grows in subalpine or subarctic areas.

== Conservation ==
As of 2023, its conservation status was Not Threatened.

== Gallery ==
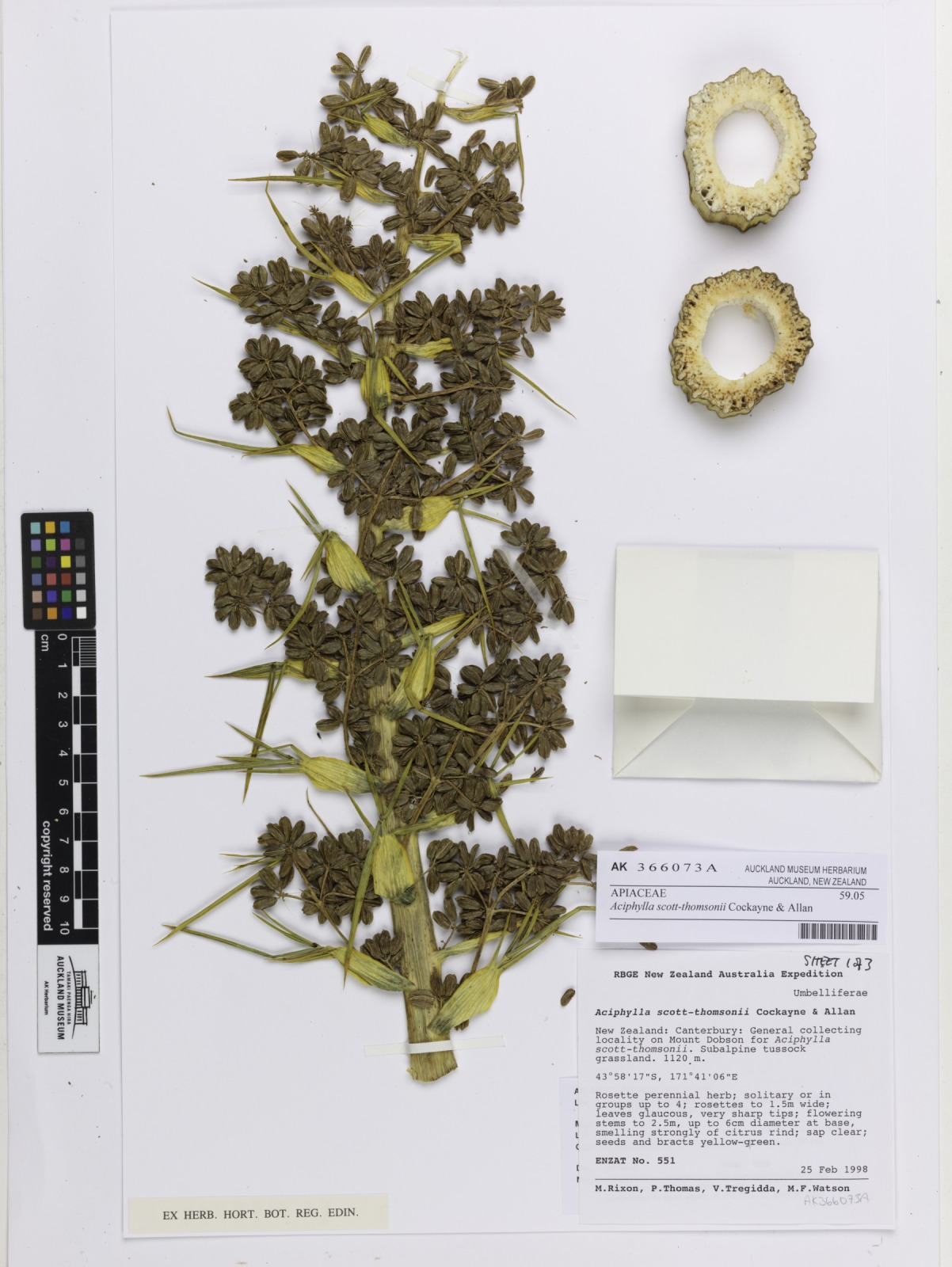

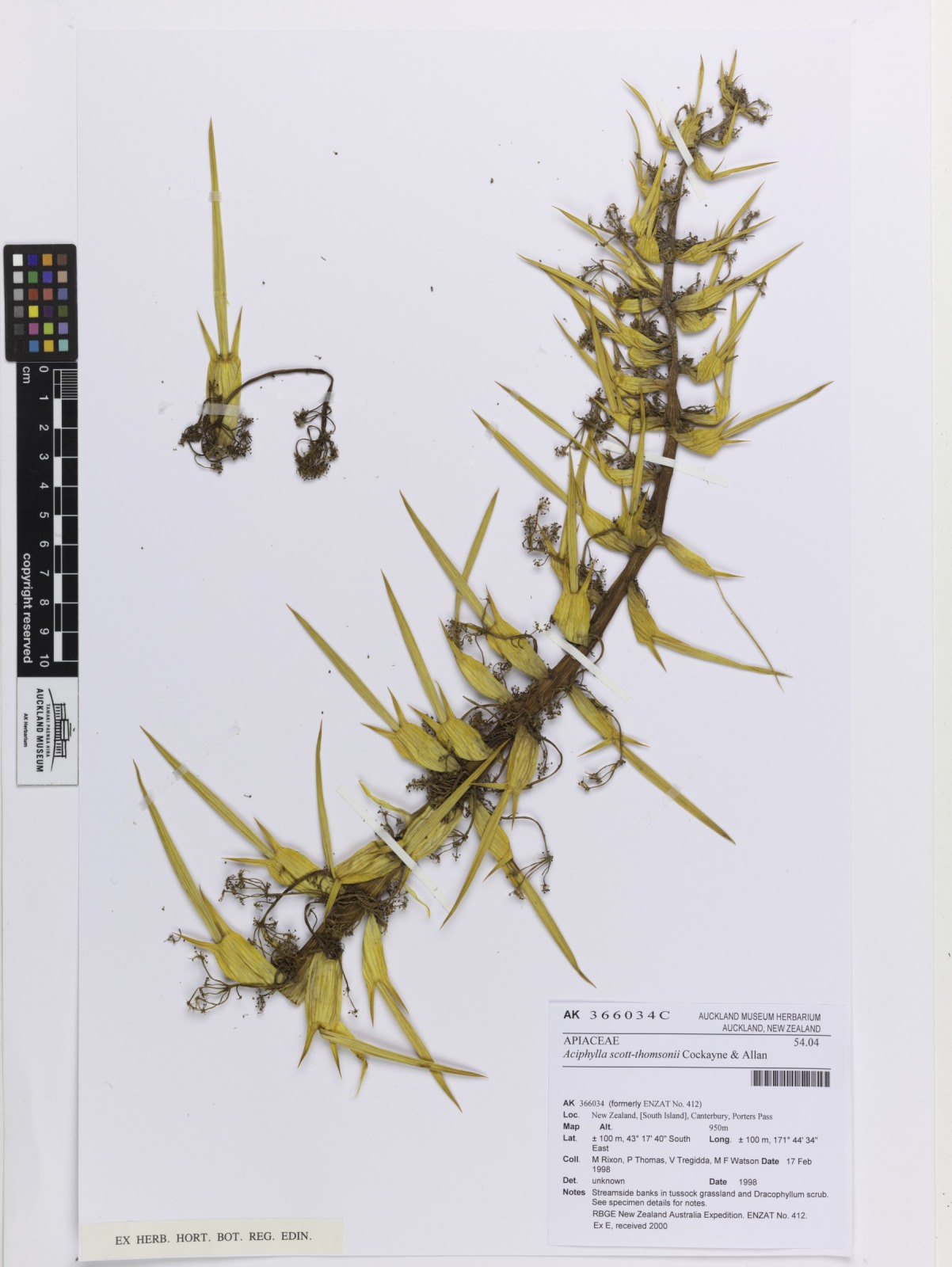

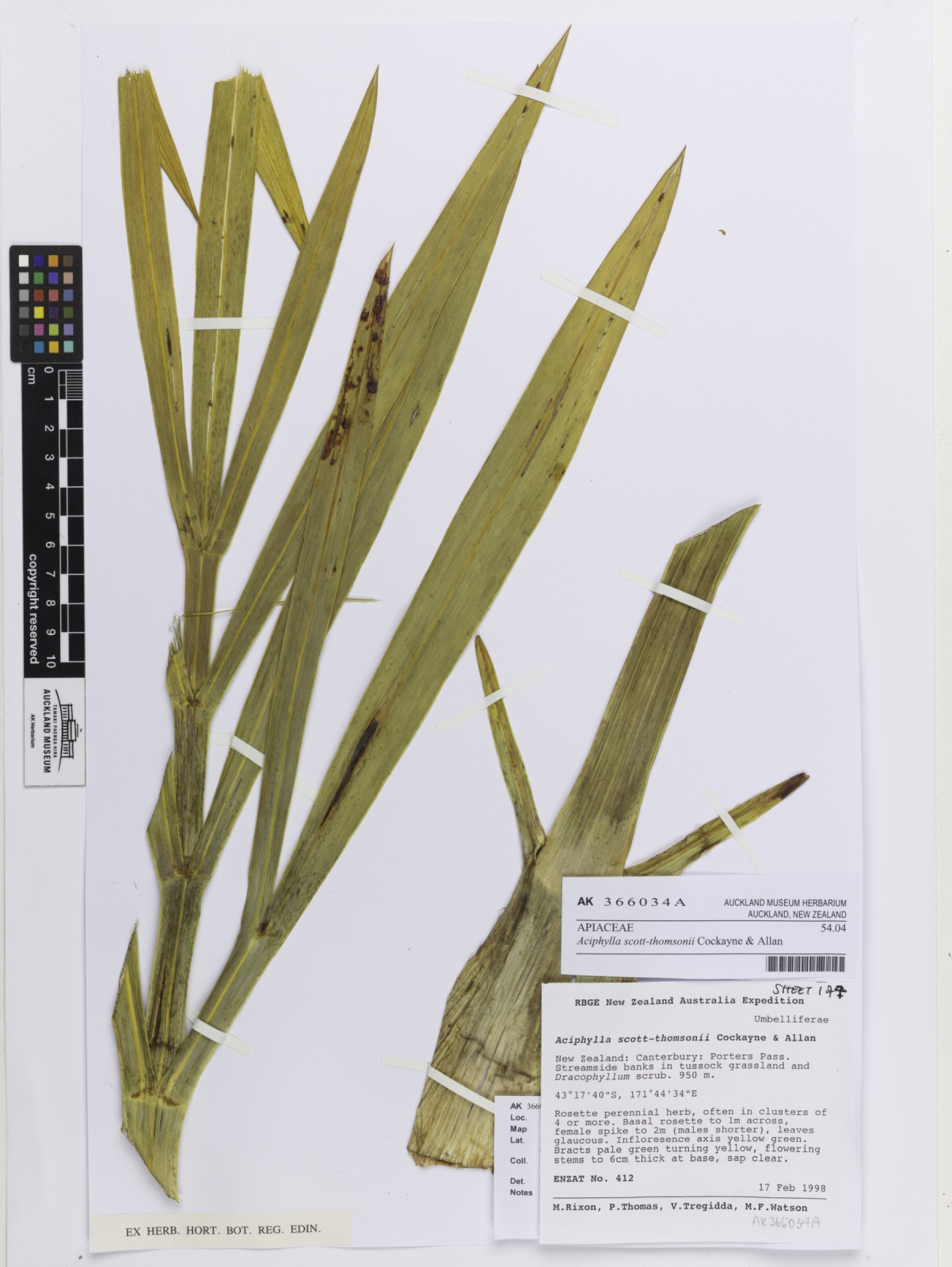
