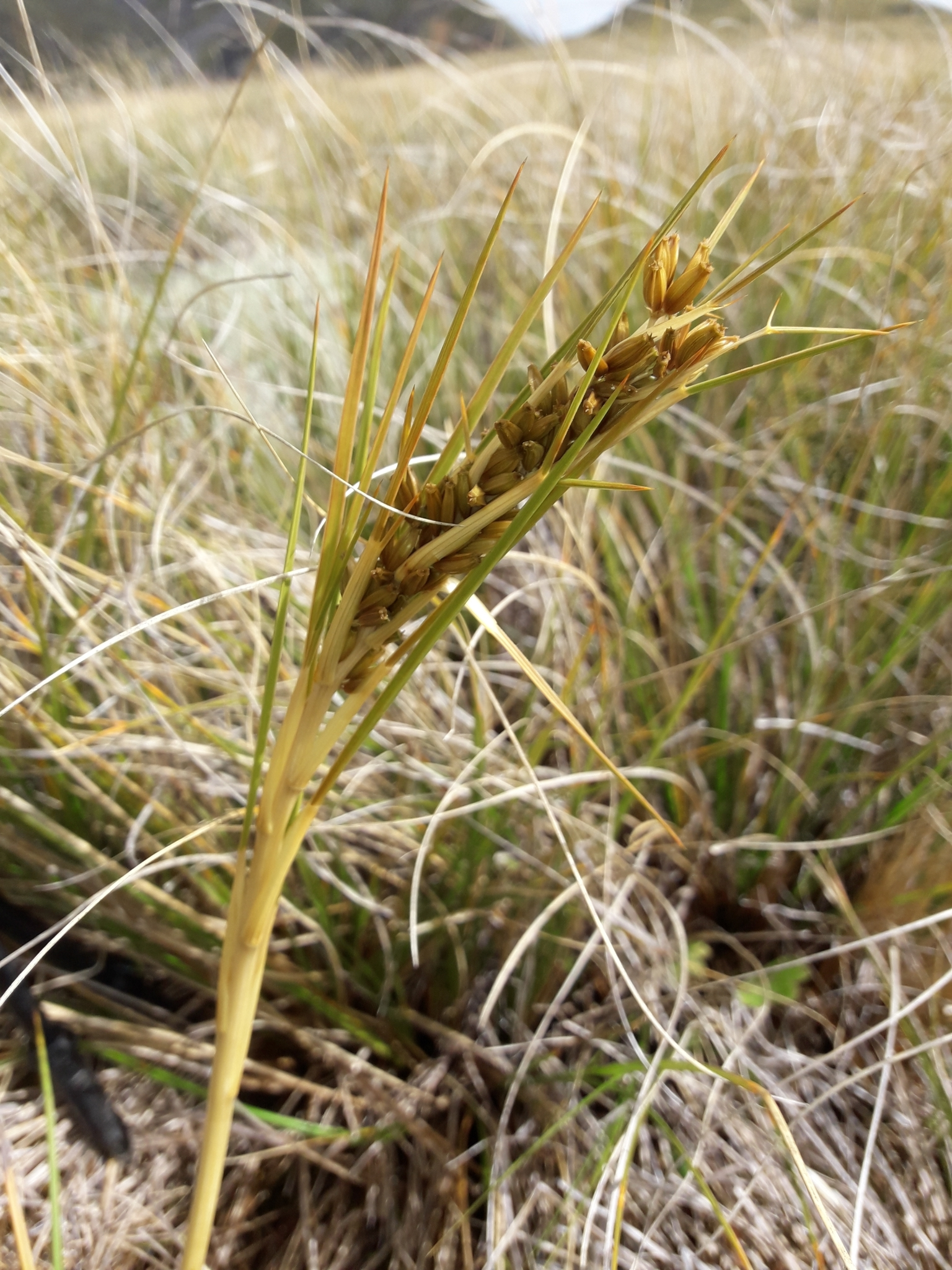

Scientific classification
- Kingdom: Plantae
- Clade: Tracheophytes
- Clade: Angiosperms
- Clade: Eudicots
- Clade: Asterids
- Order: Apiales
- Family: Apiaceae
- Genus: Aciphylla
- Species: A. anomala

Binomial name
- Aciphylla anomala Allan

= Aciphylla anomala =

Species of flowering plant

Aciphylla anomala is a species of flowering plant in the family Apiaceae. It is endemic to New Zealand. It was formally described by botanist Harry Allan in his 1961 work Flora of New Zealand. The type was collected on Mount Peel. The specific epithet is derived from the Ancient Greek anōmalía, meaning "unusual".

The plant grows as tall spikey leaves that are surrounded by rosettes of stiff, pointed leaves lacking stipules, with a variable number of leaflets per leaf. When flowering, the plant reaches heights of up to 45 cm (18 in). The flower spike is tall and sparsely leaved. Aciphylla polita is somewhat similar in appearance, but can be distinguished by its more dense inflorescence.

== Distribution ==
It occurs in tussock grasslands and has been recorded growing at elevations ranging between 1,400 and 1,700 m (4,600 and 5,600 ft). It disperses its seeds via winged schizocarps.

== Conservation status ==
This plant is endemic. Its current conservation status is Not Threatened (as of 2023).

== Gallery ==
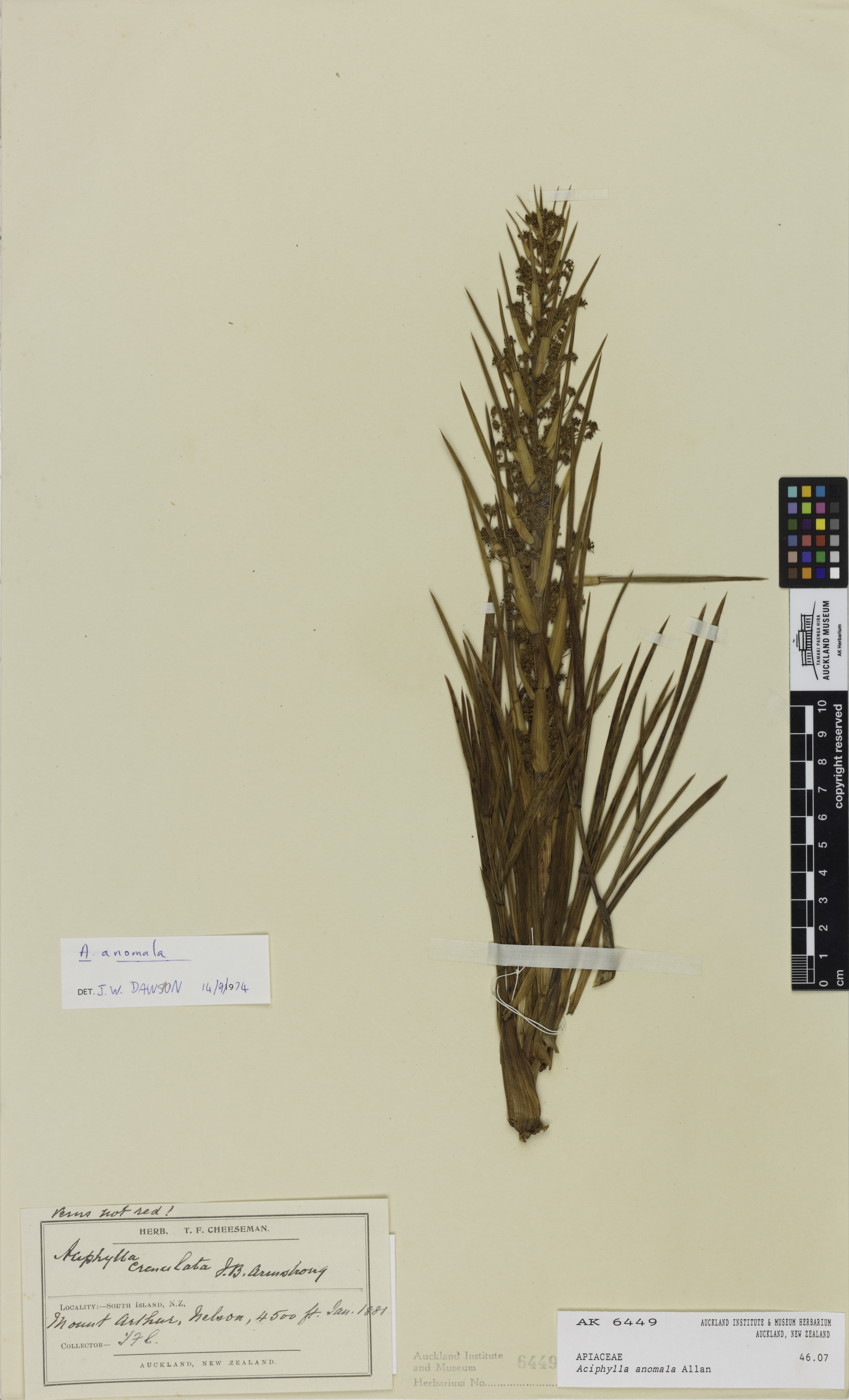
Type specimen from the herbarium of Auckland War Memorial Museum

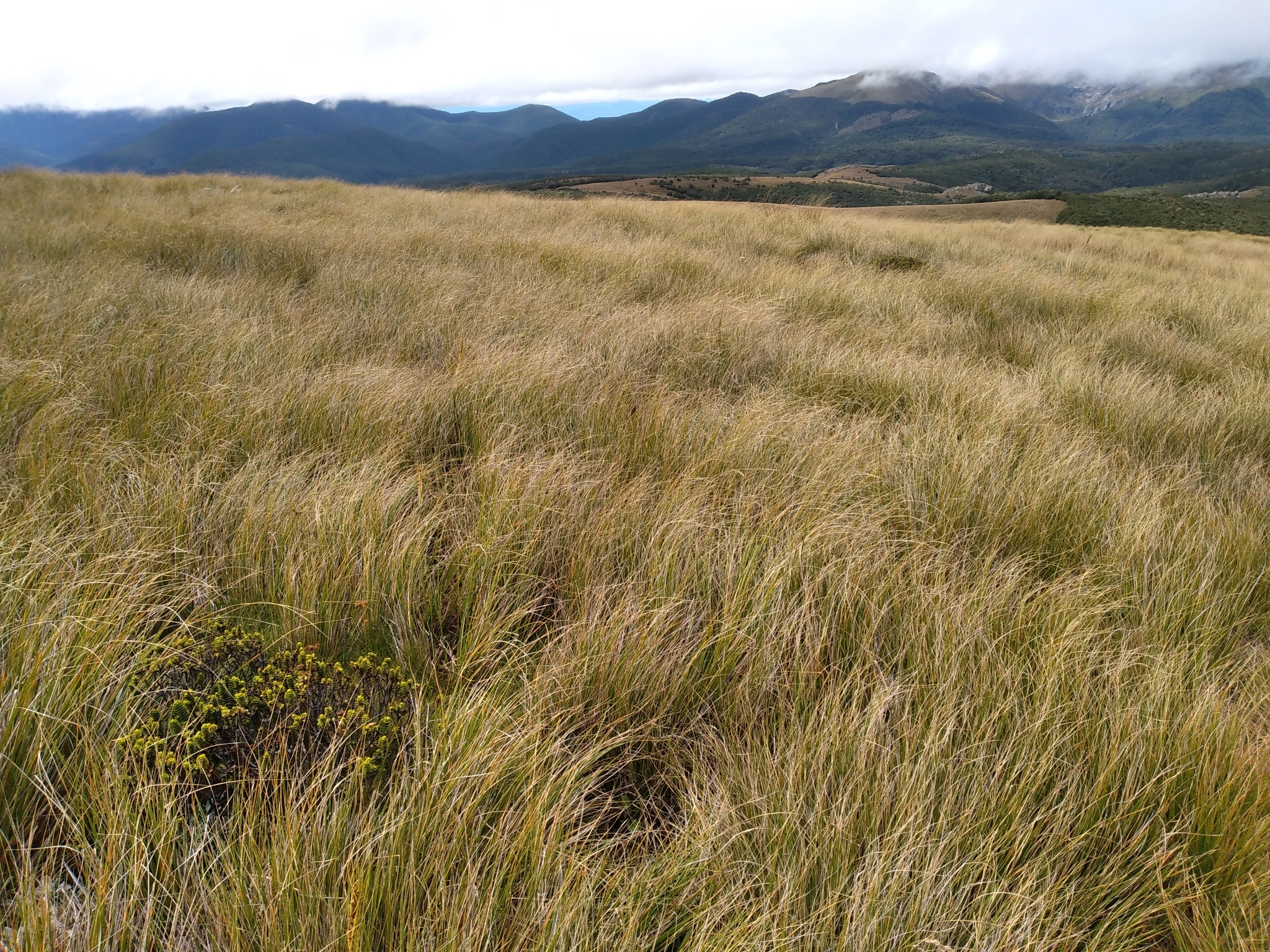
A. anomala growing near the type locality of the Peel Range, Kahurangi National Park

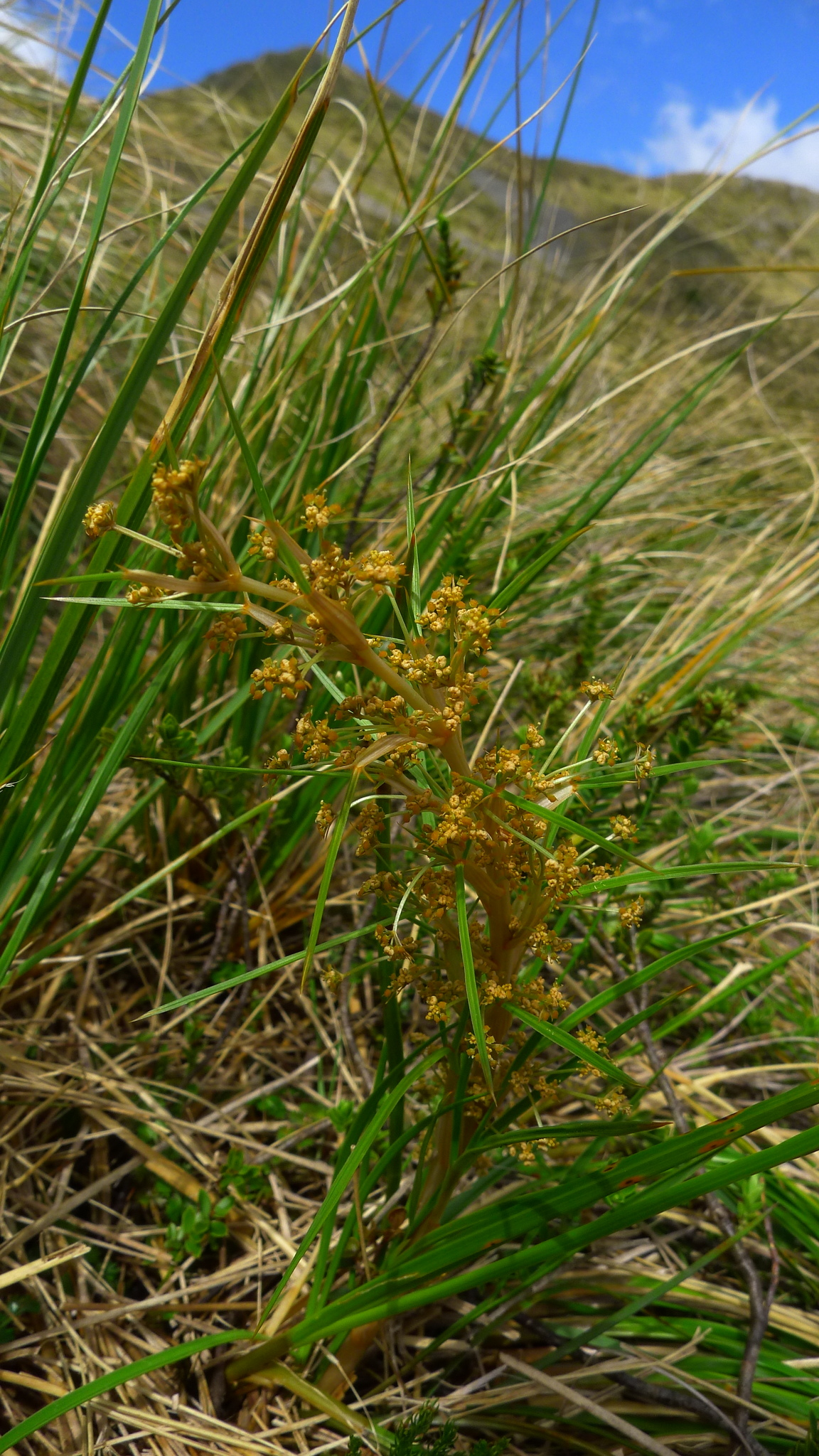
Inflorescence
