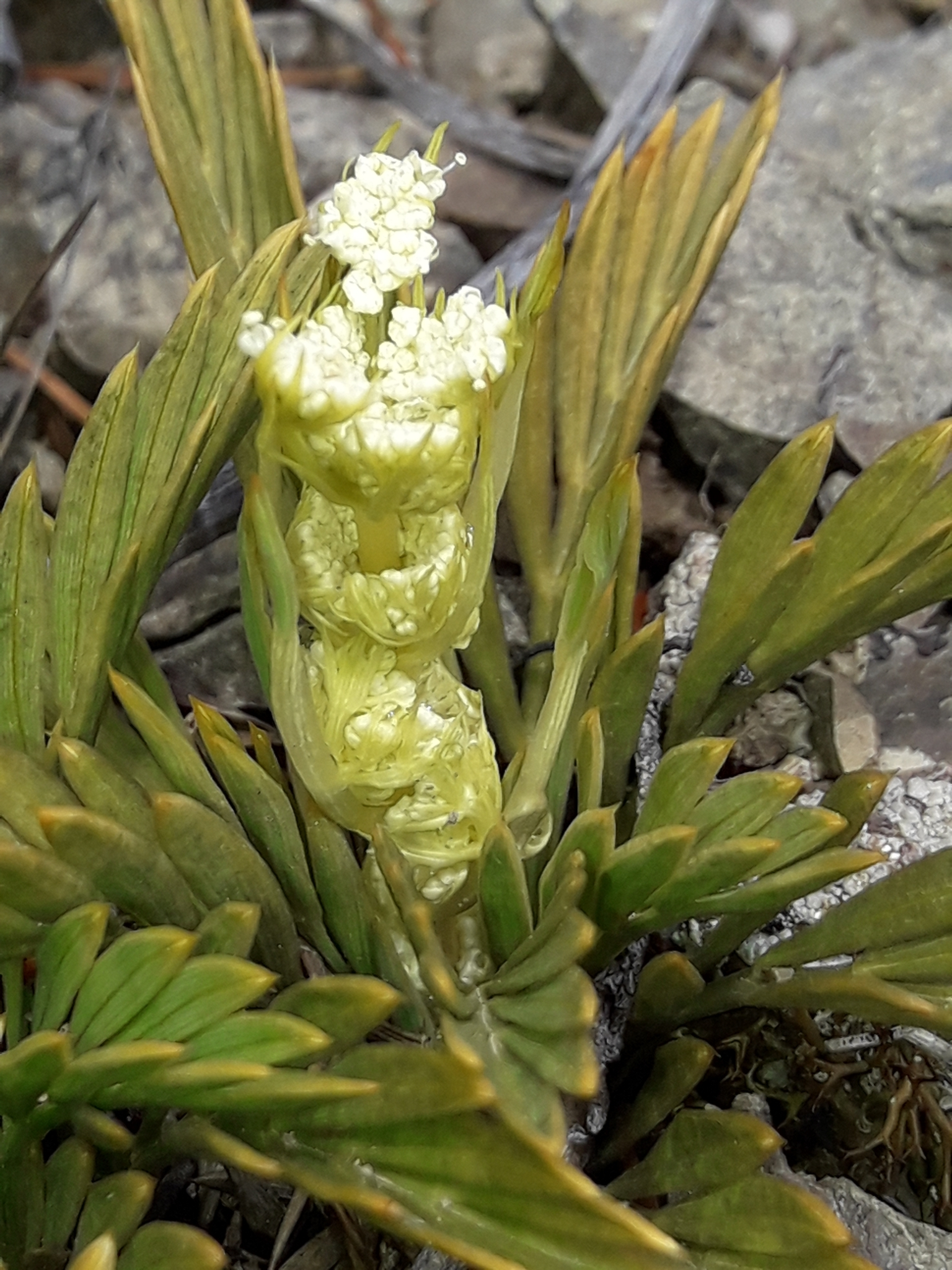
- Aciphylla monroi in Kaikōura

Conservation status
- Not Threatened (NZ TCS)

Scientific classification
- Kingdom: Plantae
- Clade: Embryophytes
- Clade: Tracheophytes
- Clade: Angiosperms
- Clade: Eudicots
- Clade: Asterids
- Order: Apiales
- Family: Apiaceae
- Genus: Aciphylla
- Species: A. monroi

Binomial name
- Aciphylla monroi Hook.f.

= Aciphylla monroi =

Species of flowering plant

Aciphylla monroi, also known as little speargrass, is a species of speargrass endemic to New Zealand.

== Description ==
It is a small speargrass with spiky leaves and white or yellow flowers. The leaves are up to 18 cm (7.1 in) long and grey-green or yellowish.

== Range ==
It is endemic to New Zealand, and restricted to the South Island.

== Habitat ==
It is found in alpine areas.

== Etymology ==
Monroi was named for Sir David Monro, a New Zealand politician.

== Conservation status ==
As of 2023, its conservation status was assessed as "Not Threatened".
