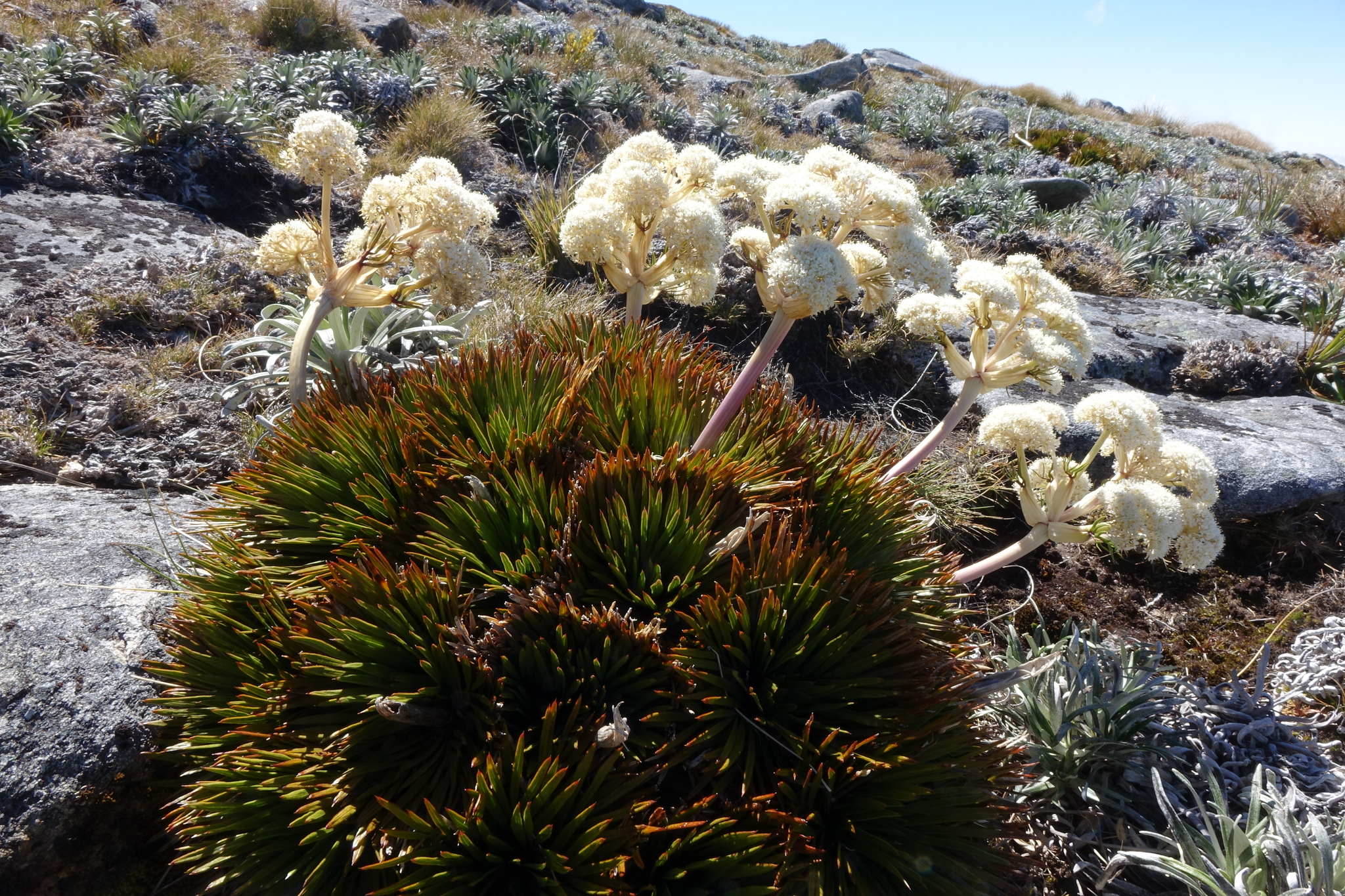

Scientific classification
- Kingdom: Plantae
- Clade: Embryophytes
- Clade: Tracheophytes
- Clade: Spermatophytes
- Clade: Angiosperms
- Clade: Eudicots
- Clade: Asterids
- Order: Apiales
- Family: Apiaceae
- Genus: Aciphylla
- Species: A. congesta

Binomial name
- Aciphylla congesta Cheeseman, 1914

= Aciphylla congesta =

Species of flowering plant

Aciphylla congesta is a species of flowering plant in the genus Aciphylla endemic to New Zealand. It was first described by Thomas Frederic Cheeseman in 1914.

It is a tufted herb that forms clumps of leaves up to 60 centimetres (24 inches) across. It produces globular heads ('snowballs') of creamy white flowers on a stout but long fleshy stalk. Flowers are produced by both the male and female plants.

== Distribution ==
It is endemic to New Zealand, and can be found in the southwest of the South Island (in south Westland, western Otago, north-western Southland, and Fiordland). It is found from 1,200 to 2,000 metres.

It is found in fellfields with high rainfall, exposed slopes, and snow accumulation.

== Conservation status ==
Its current conservation status is Not Threatened (as of 2023). It is naturally uncommon.

== Gallery ==
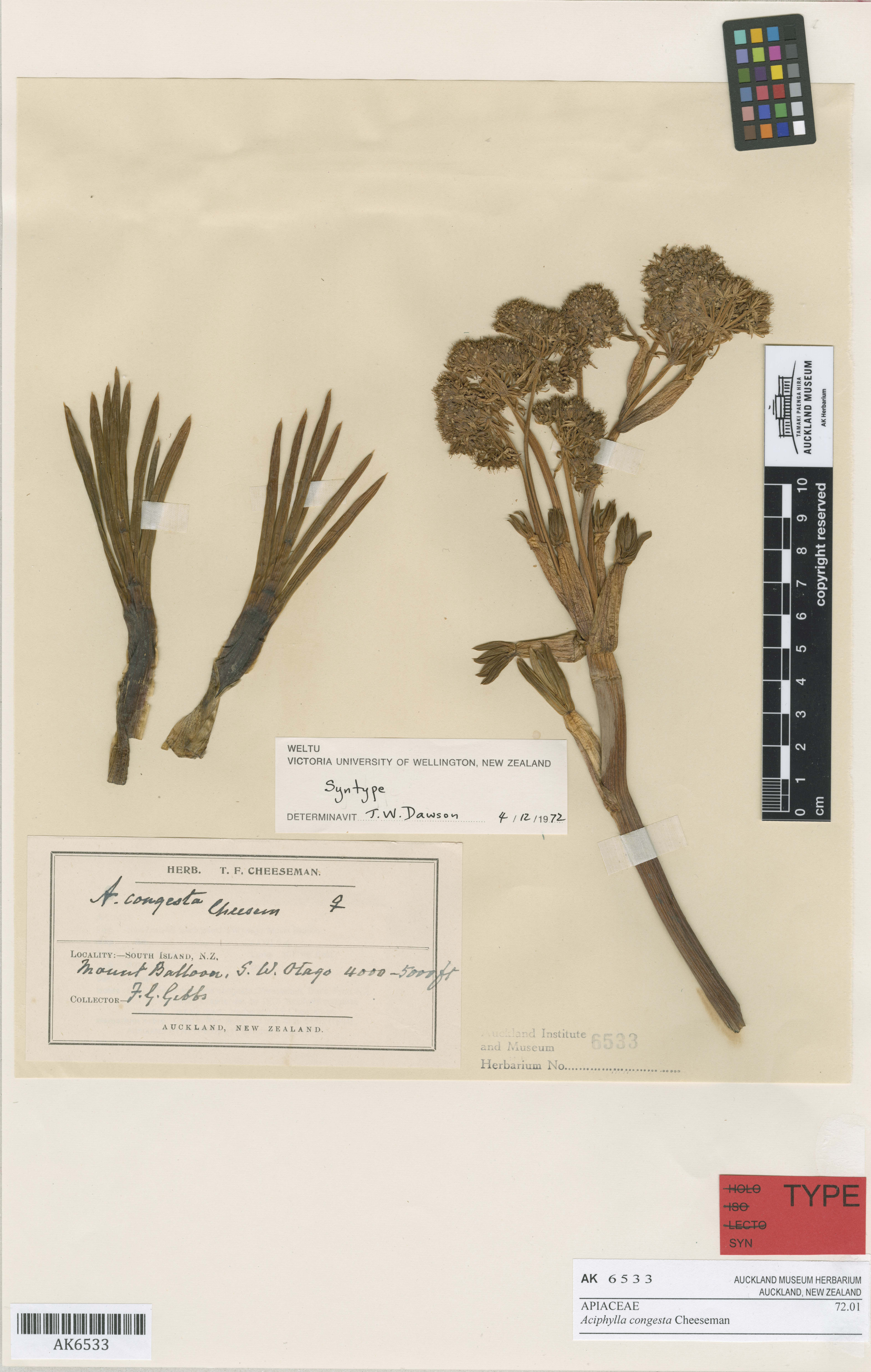
Syntype from the herbarium of Auckland War Memorial Museum

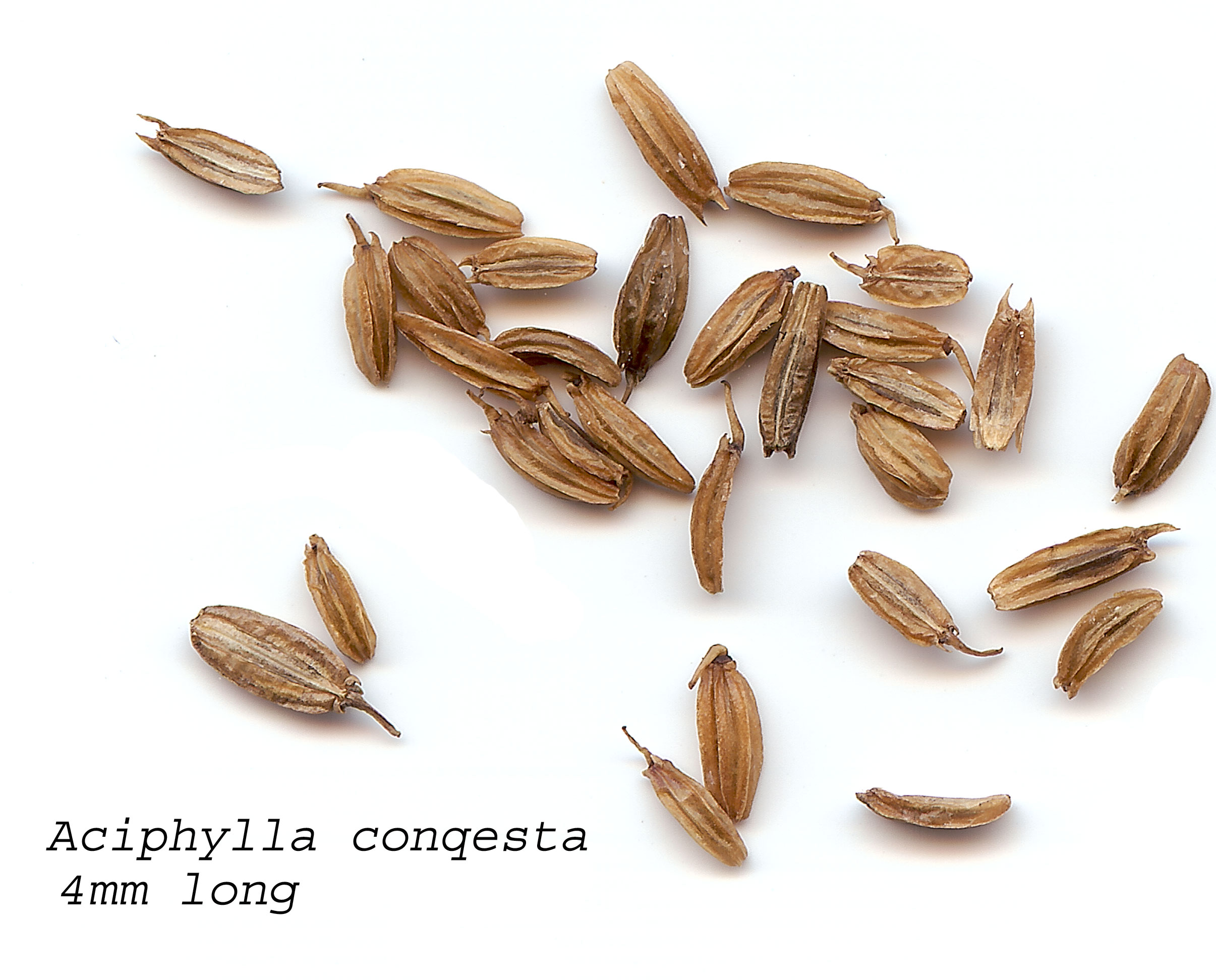
Seeds

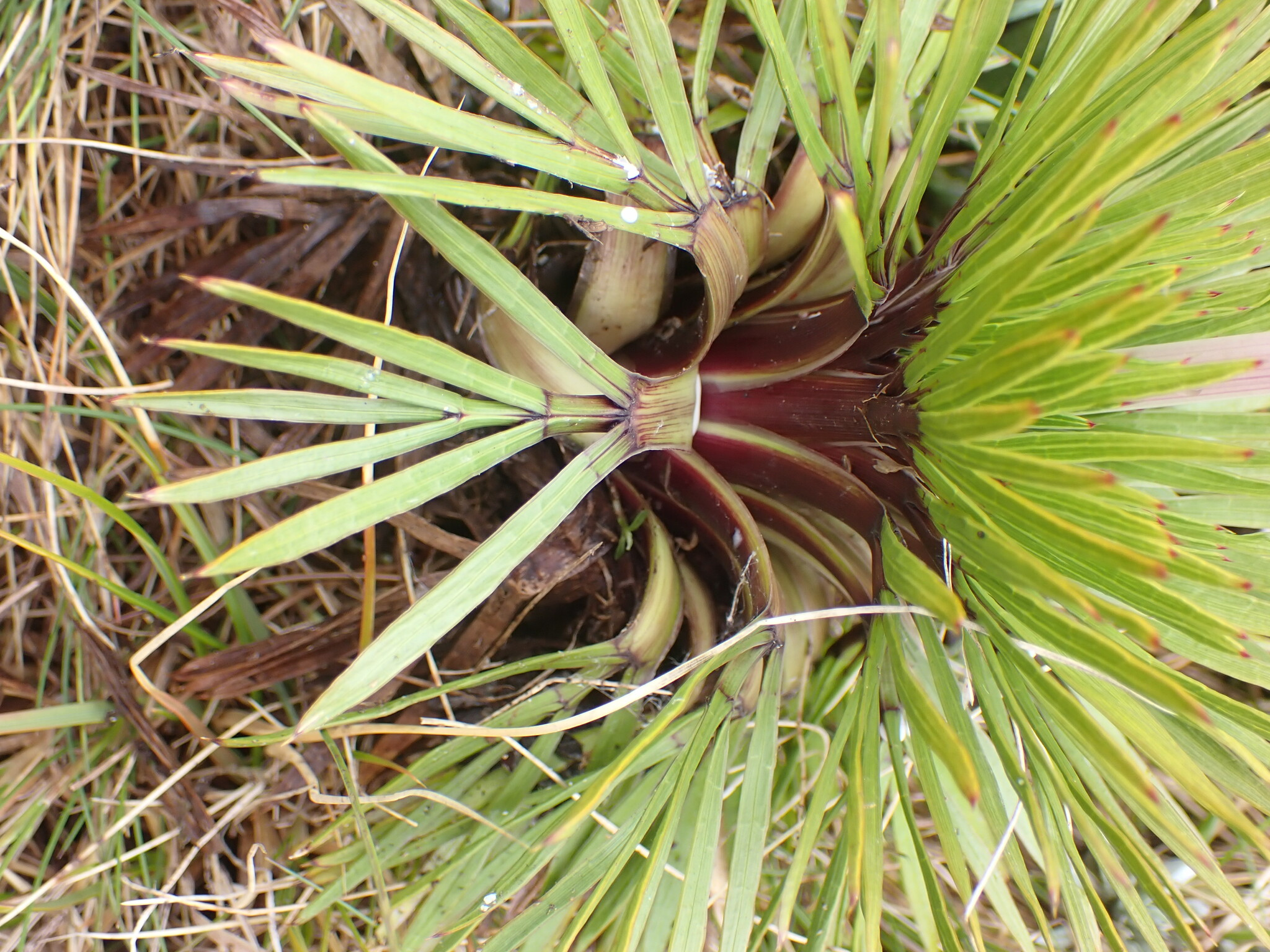
Leaves

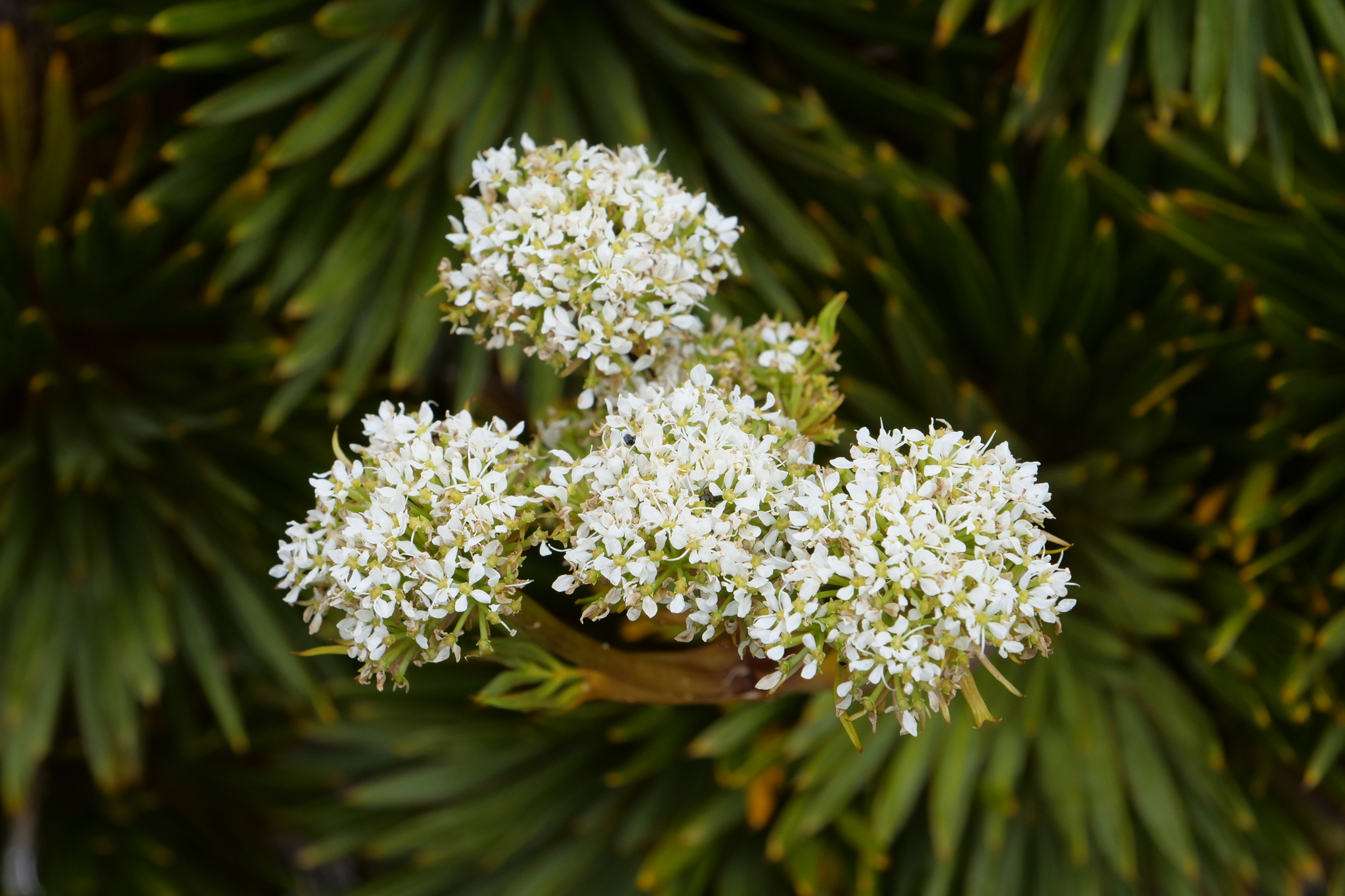
Flowers

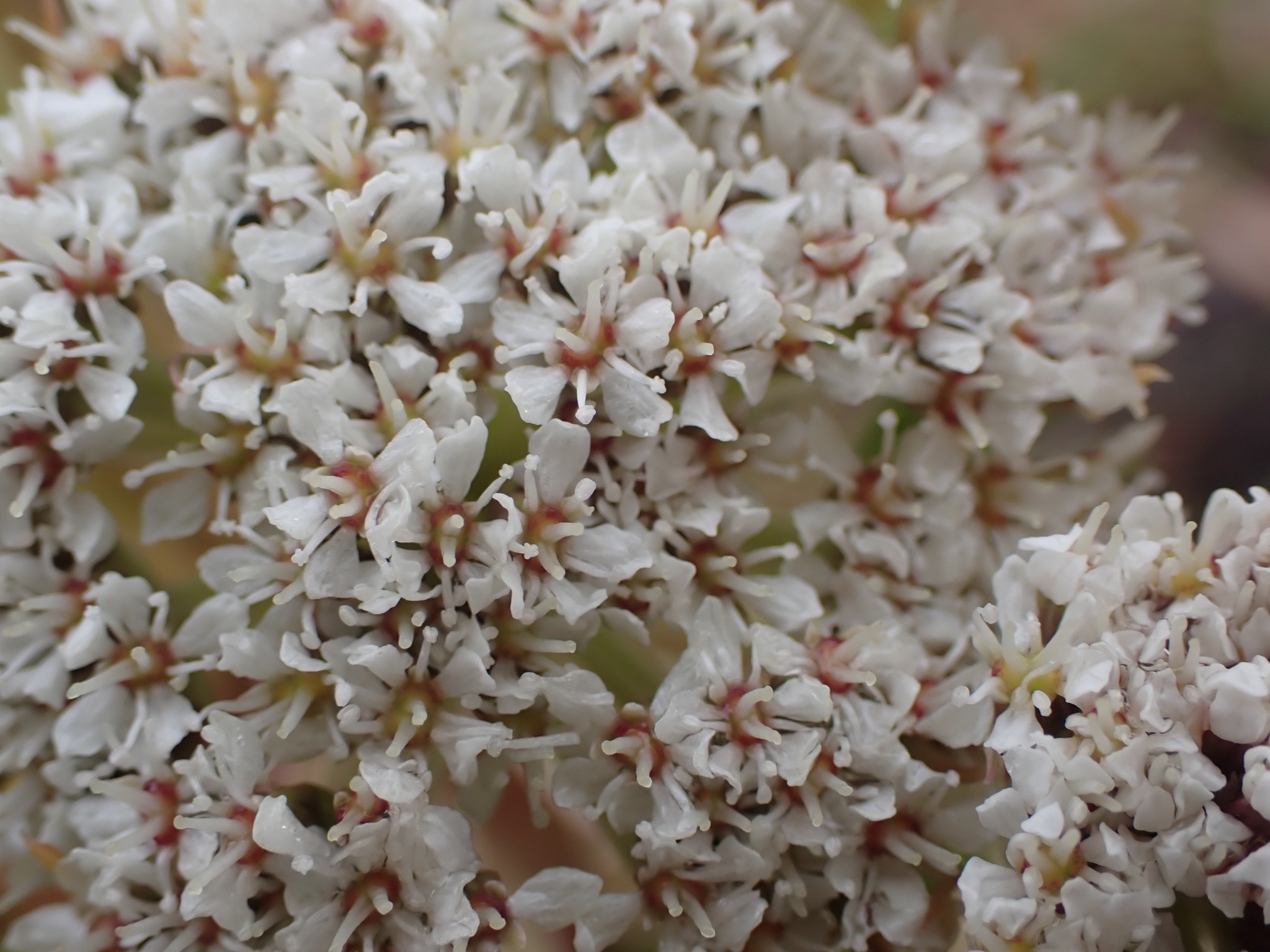
Flowers (close-up)

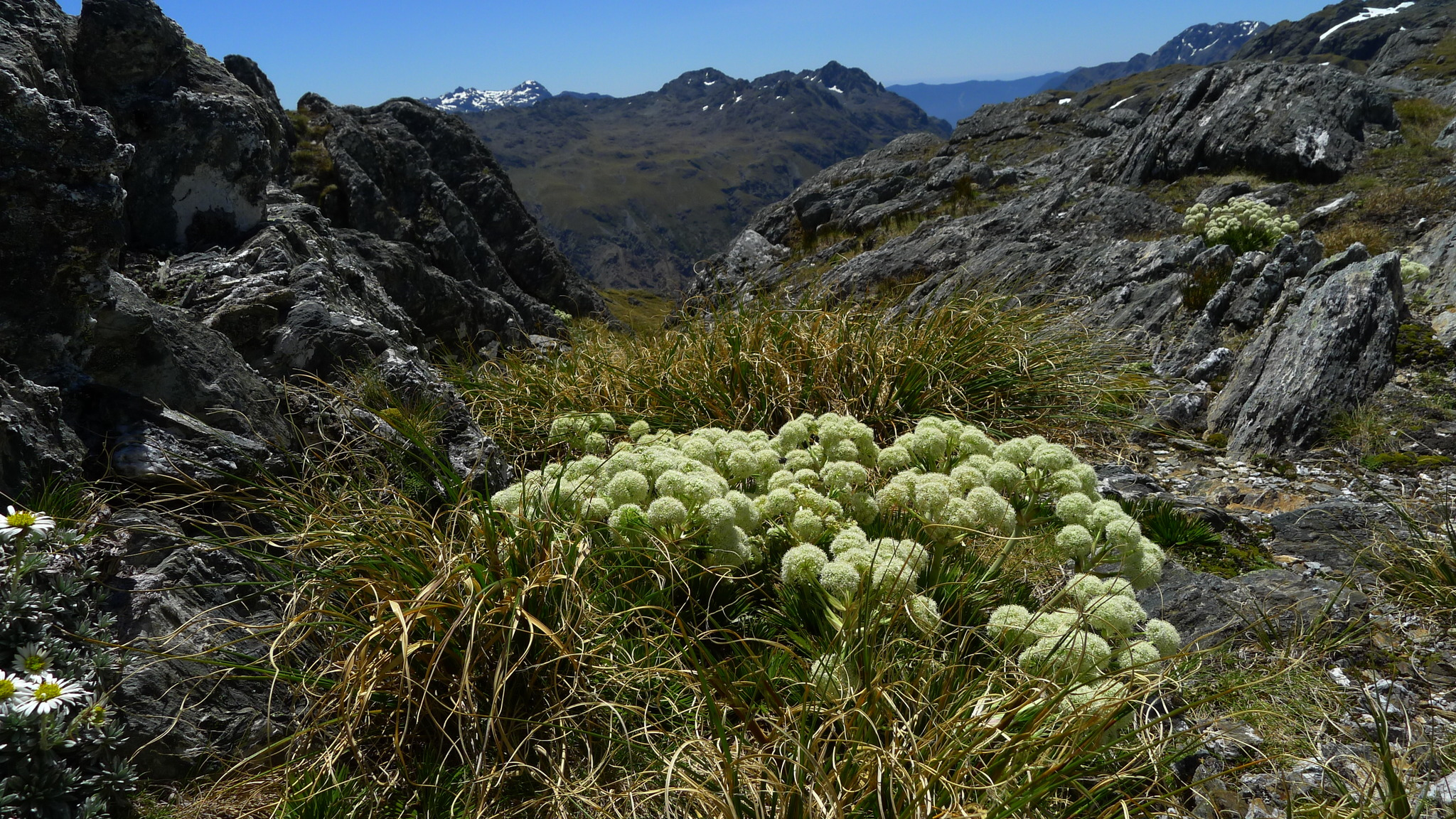
A. congesta growing in an alpine area of Mount Aspiring National Park
