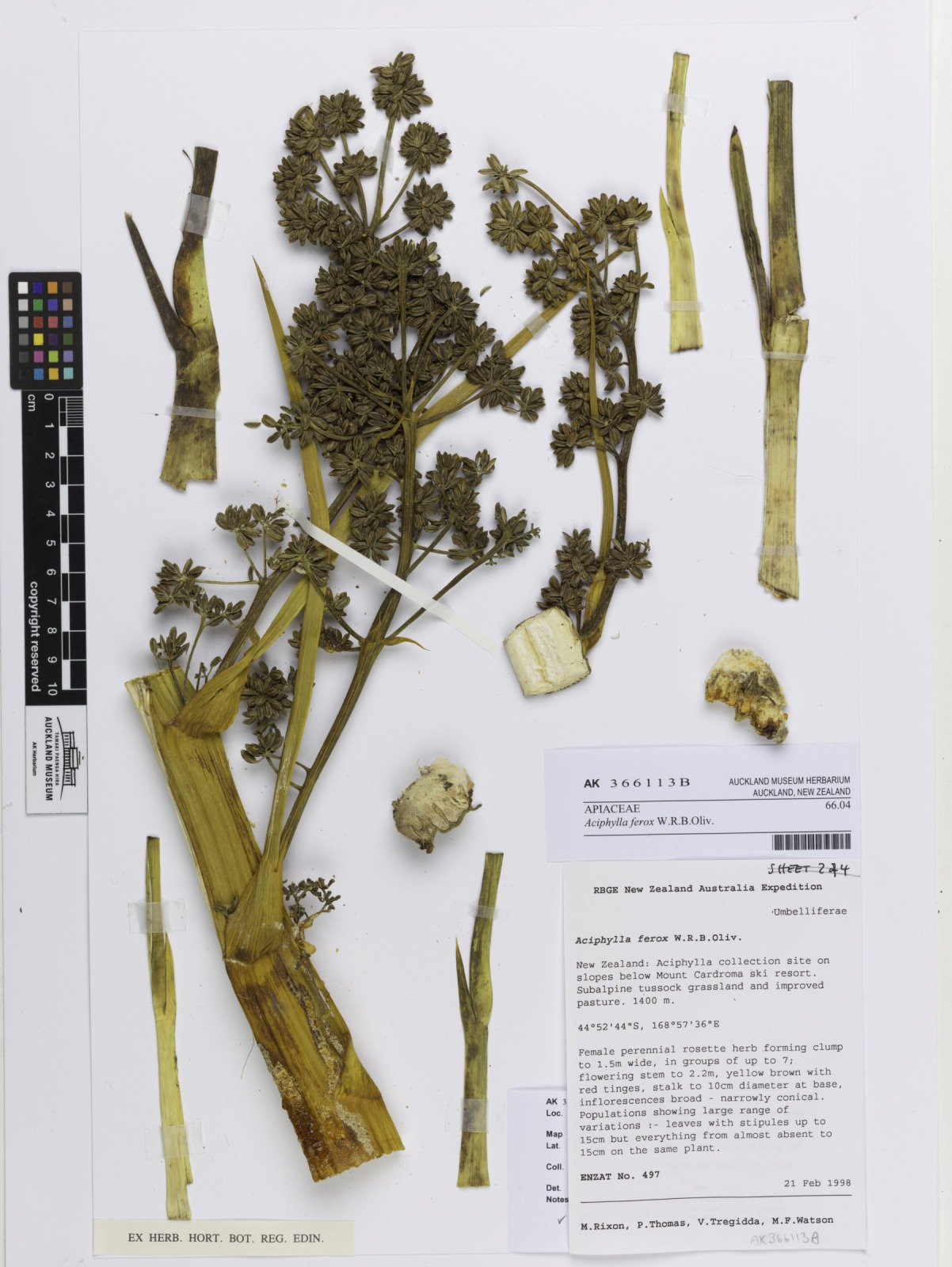

Scientific classification
- Kingdom: Plantae
- Clade: Tracheophytes
- Clade: Angiosperms
- Clade: Eudicots
- Clade: Asterids
- Order: Apiales
- Family: Apiaceae
- Genus: Aciphylla
- Species: A. ferox

Binomial name
- Aciphylla ferox W.R.B.Oliv

= Aciphylla ferox =

Species of plant

Aciphylla ferox, also called fierce speargrass or taramea, is a species of Aciphylla endemic to the South Island of New Zealand.

== Description ==
This large perennial herb forms stout tussocks up to 1 m (3 ft 3 in) high.

It can be found both as single plant or as part of a small group. Its leaves are 40 cm (16 in) long.

The male plant produces stout flowering stems, with yellow flowers appearing from November through to January or February. It fruits from January to March.

== Distribution ==
It is endemic to the South Island of New Zealand. It is found between Nelson and North Canterbury.

It grows in low alpine areas, and is common in subalpine scrub, areas of mixed snow tussock and scrub, grasslands, and herbfields.

== Conservation ==
As of 2023, its conservation status was Not Threatened.
