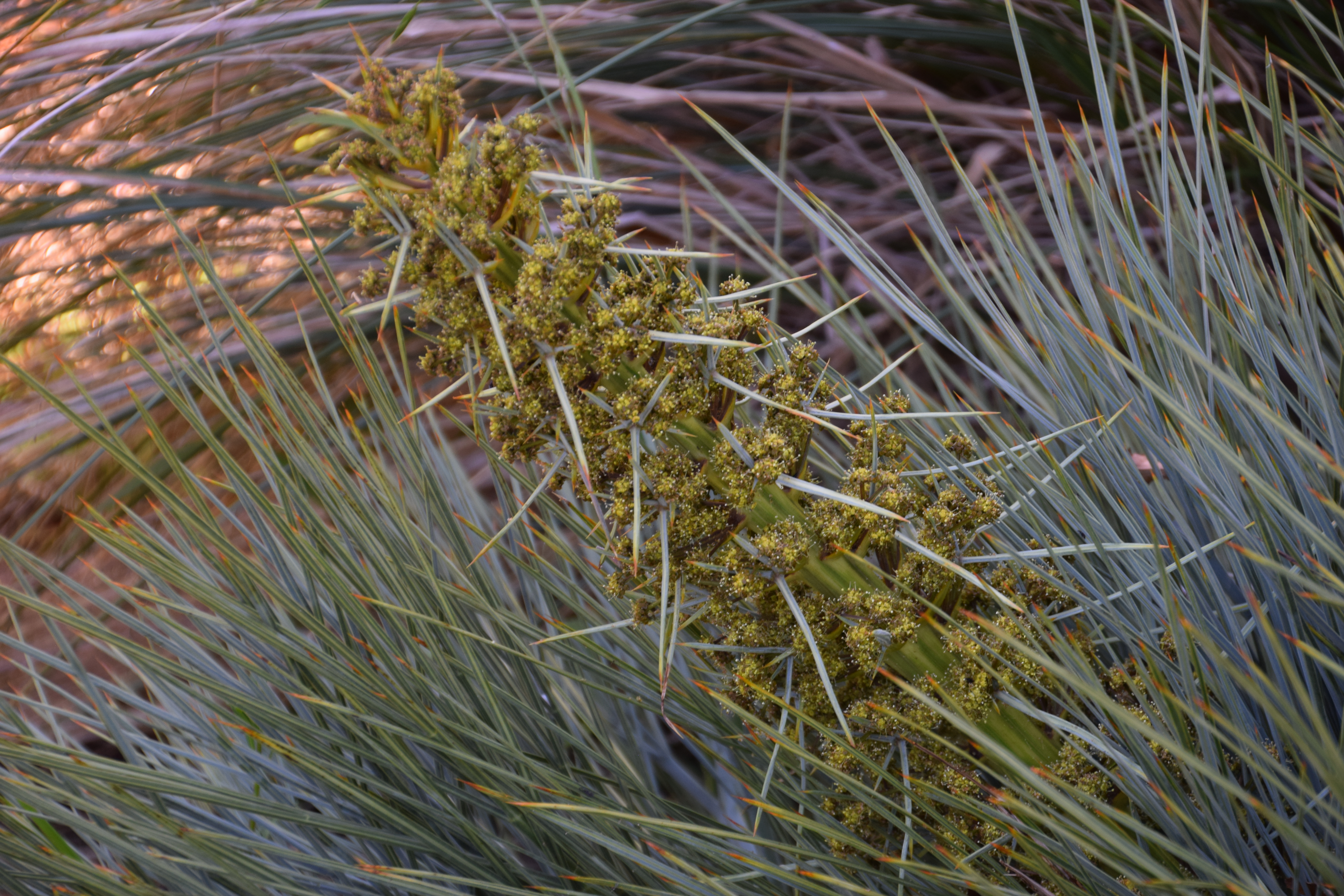

Scientific classification
- Kingdom: Plantae
- Clade: Tracheophytes
- Clade: Angiosperms
- Clade: Eudicots
- Clade: Asterids
- Order: Apiales
- Family: Apiaceae
- Genus: Aciphylla
- Species: A. squarrosa

Binomial name
- Aciphylla squarrosa J.R.Forst. & G.Forst.

Synonyms
- Gingidium squarrosum (J.R.Forst. & G.Forst.) F.Muell.; Laserpitium aciphylla L.f.; Ligosticon aciphyllum (L.f.) St.-Lag.; Ligusticum aciphylla (L.f.) Spreng.

= Aciphylla squarrosa =

Species of flowering plant

Aciphylla squarrosa, or common speargrass, is a species of Aciphylla endemic to New Zealand.

== Description ==
It is a woody perennial herb that forms dense and robust tussocks with a central flowering stem. The basal leaves are bluish-grey, and divide three times to form long and pointed spikes. They are hairless, and have a finely toothed margin.

It can grow up to 1 m (3 ft 3 in) tall.

It produces 2–4 mm (0.079–0.157 in) green or yellow symmetric flowers from October to December, and 6–8 mm (0.24–0.31 in) dry fruits from November to March.

== Range ==
It can be found on the North and South Islands from Mount Hikurangi to the Kaikoura Ranges, as well as some offshore islands like Mana Island. It grows in habitats ranging from coastal to montane.

== Ecology ==
Aciphylla squarrosa is the host plant for Lyperobius huttoni, the Speargrass Weevil.

== Etymology ==
Squarrosa comes from the Latin for 'rough'.

== Taxonomy ==
Aciphylla squarrosa contains the following varieties:

- Aciphylla squarrosa var. squarrosa
- Aciphylla squarrosa var. flaccida

== Conservation status ==
In 2023, it was classified as At Risk – Declining.
