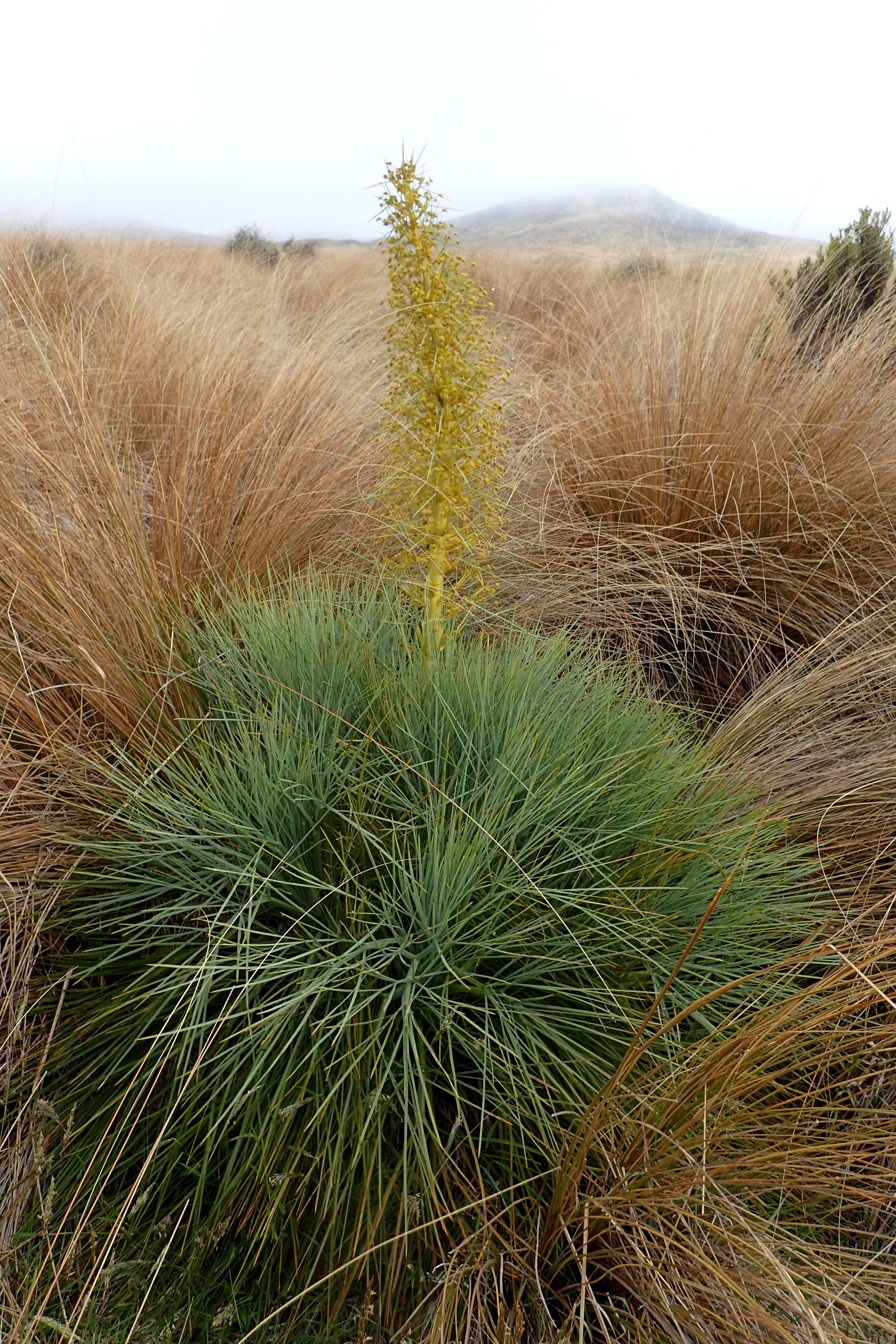
- Aciphylla glaucescens in Burwood Bush (Red Tussock) Scientific Reserve

Scientific classification
- Kingdom: Plantae
- Clade: Tracheophytes
- Clade: Angiosperms
- Clade: Eudicots
- Clade: Asterids
- Order: Apiales
- Family: Apiaceae
- Genus: Aciphylla
- Species: A. glaucescens

Binomial name
- Aciphylla glaucescens W.R.B.Oliv

= Aciphylla glaucescens =

Species of plant endemic to New Zealand

Aciphylla glaucescens is a species of Aciphylla endemic to New Zealand.

== Description ==
This perennial herb forms a large tussock up to 1.5 m (4 ft 11 in) tall. Its leaves are greyish-green and droopy, and are up to 1.5 m (4 ft 11 in) long.

It can be found on its own or in a group.

It produces flowering stems up to 2 m (6 ft 7 in) high, with the female plant producing denser flower clusters. It flowers from November to January, and fruits from December to February (though this can extend to June).

== Distribution ==
It is endemic to New Zealand, and is found on both the North and South Islands. It grows in temperate areas, ranging from Mount Hikurangi in the North Island to the Dunsdale - Riverton area in the South Island.

It is found in coastal to low-alpine habitats, including along streams, in banks or depressions, in mixed tussock-scrub, and in grassland.

== Conservation ==
As of 2023, its conservation status was "Not Threatened".
