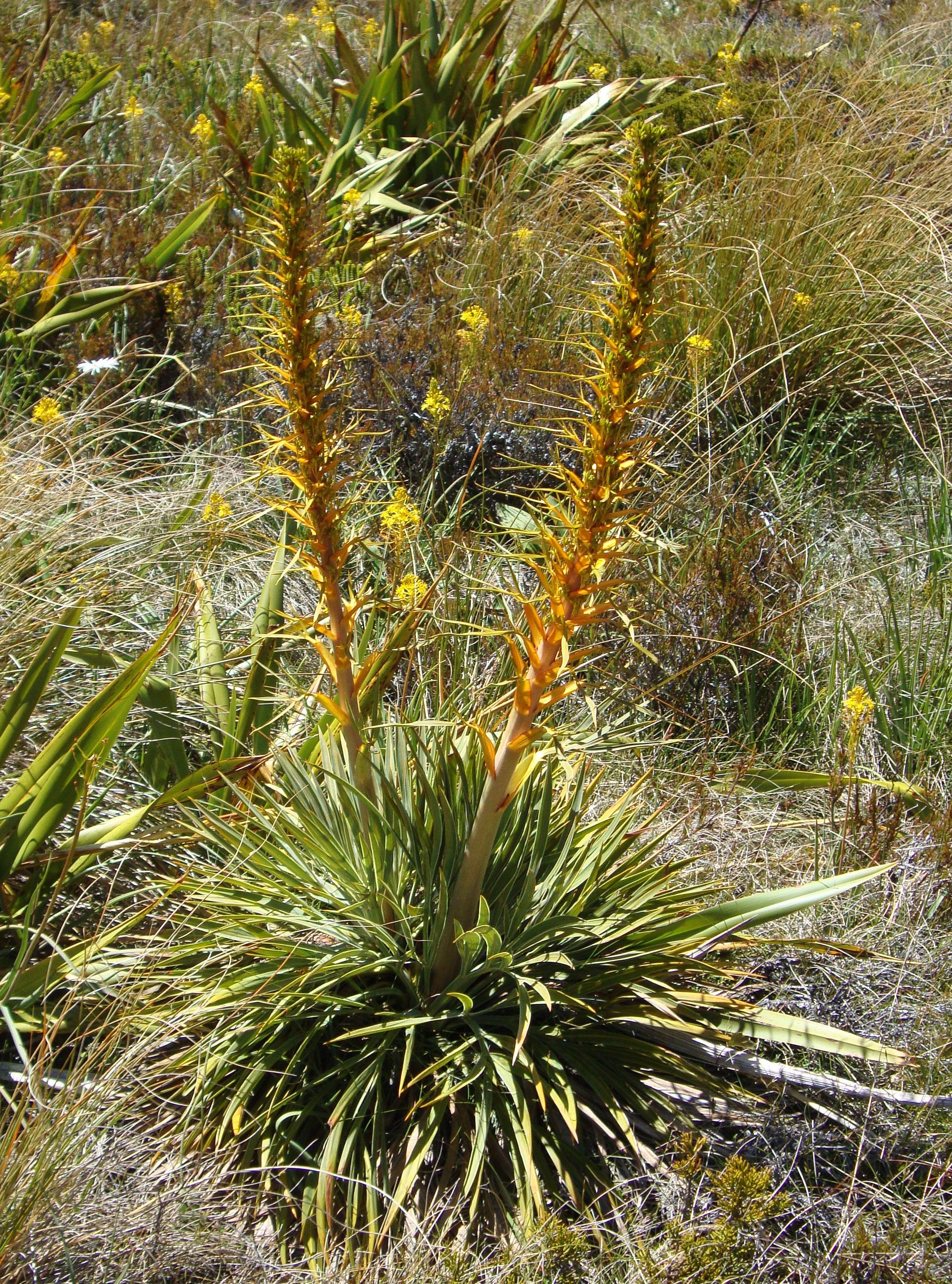
- Aciphylla colensoi

Scientific classification
- Kingdom: Plantae
- Clade: Tracheophytes
- Clade: Angiosperms
- Clade: Eudicots
- Clade: Asterids
- Order: Apiales
- Family: Apiaceae
- Subfamily: Apioideae
- Tribe: Aciphylleae
- Genus: Aciphylla; J.R. Forster & G. Forster

Synonyms
- Coxella Cheeseman & Hemsl.

= Aciphylla =

Genus of flowering plants

Aciphylla is a genus of about 40 species of herbaceous plants in the family Apiaceae, all but two of them endemic to New Zealand (the remaining two species are found only in Australia). They range from small cushion plants to tall flower spikes surrounded by rosettes of stiff, pointed leaves, the latter probably adaptations to prevent browsing by moa. Their common name is speargrass or Spaniard. Most Aciphylla species preferred habitats are in subalpine or alpine habitats in the South Island. Fragrant oil extracted from some large species, known as taramea, is still used as a perfume by Māori.

== Description ==
Like other species in the family Apiaceae, speargrasses have taproots and small flowers, which are clustered into inflorescences called umbels. Species can be distinguished by size, habit, flower head and bract size and shape, leaf shape, and the type of stipules growing at the leaf base. Speargrasses in the A. aurea group (six species and three tag-named taxa) have milky sap, while most other species have clear sap. Aciphylla is dioecious, with separate male and female plants which do not flower every year. Because of this, identifying plants to species can depend on leaf characters and locality. The seeds of Aciphylla are winged schizocarps dispersed by the wind.

Many species of speargrass have tough, rigid leaves and flower bracts tipped with long sharp spikes, arranged in one or more rosettes which present spines in every direction. This is reflected in the name of the genus: Aci (needle) phylla (leaf). This form is hypothesised to have evolved to deter browsing by birds: the extinct giant moa. Long spines are known to deter ratite birds from browsing other plants, and the two large-leaved species endemic to the Chatham Islands, which never had moa, have soft leaves without spikes.

Speargrasses range from small, inconspicuous herbs to large spiky mounds, but they take four main forms:

1. Large speargrasses, often known as Spaniards (although this somewhat derogatory term is avoided in recent publications) or by their Māori name taramea, usually over 50 cm tall, with tough pointed leaves
2. Small speargrasses, less than 50 cm tall (small speargrasses are collectively known as papaī by Māori, though this name really refers to their tap root), with a variety of leaf types from soft to thistle-like
3. Sparsely-leaved small species that grow amongst tussocks, and are difficult to see unless in flower
4. Small cushion forms with rigid leaves, living in alpine areas

== Taxonomy ==
Around 45–52 species of Aciphylla are recognised, along with forms known only by informal tag names, which may or may not represent distinct species. The genus is in need of taxonomic revision: some species may be hybrids; similar species with adjoining distributions such as Aciphylla aurea and A. ferox may in fact be the same species; and tag-named taxa such as Aciphylla "Cass" may belong in an existing species, or need formal description and naming. The following species list is from Mark (2021), with some names from Salmon (1991):

=== Large speargrasses ===
- Aciphylla aurea W.R.B. Oliver (Golden Spaniard, golden speargrass) – Nelson-Marlborough south, 300–1500 m
- Aciphylla colensoi Hook.f. (Giant speargrass, wild Spaniard) – North and South Islands, 900–1500 m
- Aciphylla dieffenbachii Kirk (Dieffenbach's speargrass, coxella) – Chatham Islands, cliffs
- Aciphylla ferox W.R.B. Oliver (Fierce speargrass) – Nelson to North Canterbury, 600–1400 m
- Aciphylla glaucescens W.R.B. Oliver – Hikurangi to Foveaux Strait, coastal to 1400 m
- Aciphylla horrida W.R.B. Oliver (Horrid speargrass) – South Island, 600–1400 m
- Aciphylla scott-thomsonii CKN. & Allan (Giant speargrass) – Arthur's Pass south, 600–1200 m
- Aciphylla squarrosa J.R. & G. Forst. – Hikurangi in North Island to Marlborough, coastal to 1400 m
- Aciphylla subflabellata W.R.B. Oliver – Eastern Marlborough to Southland, 300–1400 m
- Aciphylla takahea W.R.B. Oliver – Central Fiordland, 900–1300 m
- Aciphylla traversii (F.Muell.) Hook.f. (Chatham Island speargrass) – Chatham Islands, open ground

=== Small speargrasses ===
- Aciphylla cartilaginea Petrie – Stewart Island, 600–900 m
- Aciphylla dissecta (Kirk) W.R.B. Oliver (Tararua speargrass) – Tararua Range, 1000–1600 m
- Aciphylla divisa Cheesem. – Central Canterbury south, 1100–1700 m
- Aciphylla hectorii Buchan. – Central and western Otago, south Westland, 1000–1800 m
- Aciphylla intermedia Petrie (possible hybrid between A. dissecta and A. colensoi)
- Aciphylla kirkii Buchan. – Central and western Otago, south Westland, 1000–1800 m
- Aciphylla lecomtei Dawson – Otago lakes to Southland, 1400–1900 m
- Aciphylla monroi Hook.f. (Little or pygmy speargrass) – Northern South Island, 1100–1700 m
- Aciphylla montana J.B. Armst. (Armstrong's speargrass) – Eastern South Island, 1100–2000 m
- Aciphylla multisecta W.R.B. Oliver – Central Westland south, 1100–1700 m
- Aciphylla pinnatifida Petrie (Subalpine Spaniard) – Otago to Southland and Fiordland, 1100–1700 m
- Aciphylla polita (Kirk) Cheesem. – Northwest Nelson, 900–1700 m
- Aciphylla similis Cheesem. – Lewis Pass to Otago Lakes, 900–1400 m
- Aciphylla stannensis Dawson (Tin Range speargrass) – Stewart Island, 550–760 m
- Aciphylla traillii Kirk (Stewart Island speargrass) – Stewart Island, 600–970 m
- Aciphylla trifoliolata Petrie – Lyall Range, north of Buller Gorge, 1300–1550 m

=== Sparse-leaved speargrasses ===
- Aciphylla anomala Allan – Northwest Nelson, 1400–1700 m
- Aciphylla crenulata J.B. Armst. – Mid–southern South Island, 900–1700 m
- Aciphylla hookeri Kirk – Northwest Nelson to Arthur's Pass, 900–1400 m
- Aciphylla indurata Cheesem. – Westland, 900–1300 m
- Aciphylla lyallii Hook.f. – Fiordland and surrounding area, 1100–1400 m

=== Cushion speargrasses ===
- Aciphylla congesta Cheesem. – Fiordland, 1700–1900 m
- Aciphylla crosby-smithii Petrie – Fiordland, 1400–1600 m
- Aciphylla dobsonii Hook.f. – South Canterbury, North Otago, 1500–2200 m
- Aciphylla leighii Allan – Fiordland, 1850–2100 m
- Aciphylla simplex Petrie – Central Otago, 1850–2100 m
- Aciphylla spedenii Cheesem. – Eyre Mountains

=== Australian speargrasses ===
There are also two Australian species:

- Aciphylla glacialis (F.Muell.) Benth. (Mountain celery) – Victoria and New South Wales
- Aciphylla simplicifolia (F.Muell.) Benth. – Victoria and New South Wales

=== Other speargrasses ===
POWO and Landcare Research list the following additional species:

- Aciphylla acutifolia Cockayne
- Aciphylla cuthbertiana Petrie
- Aciphylla decipiens (Hook.f.) Benth. & Hook.f
- Aciphylla flabellata Cockayne
- Aciphylla flexuosa W.R.B.Oliv
- Aciphylla inermis W.R.B.Oliv
- Aciphylla latibracteata W.R.B.Oliv
- Aciphylla poppelwellii Petrie
- Aciphylla townsonii Cheeseman
- Aciphylla verticillata W.R.B.Oliv
- Aciphylla ×intermedia Petrie
- Aciphylla ×latibracteata W.R.B.Oliv

== Habitat ==
All but two species of Aciphylla are confined to New Zealand; the remaining two are endemic to Australia. Most species live in or near the alpine zone, but they range from mountains to coast. The group reaches its highest diversity in the South Island.

== Cultural use ==
Māori on occasion plaited sandals out of Aciphylla leaves for travel over snowy terrain. More important, though, was the aromatic gum extracted from the leaves, used in scented oils and sachets. The Ngāi Tahu people of the South Island knew the larger Aciphylla species, especially Aciphylla aurea, as taramea (literally, "spiny thing"), and the resin (ware or wai-whenua) was referred to as ware-taramea. The smaller Aciphylla species were not used as fragrance, although their taproot, known as papaī, was eaten–the red roots of taramea were considered too bitter.

Collecting taramea resin was traditionally the work of women. It was collected by cutting or burning plants in the evening, and gathering the exuded gum (called pia) in the morning. Leaves could also be gathered, plaited, and heated over several days to force out the gum into a gourd. The process was tapu, and only young girls collected the pia after appropriate karakia (prayers) had been performed. Anyone collecting gum needed to sleep with their knees drawn up, in a crouching position, for if they slept in the ordinary way the gum would sink to the roots instead of rising.

The collected oil hardened into a resin, ware-taramea, or could be mixed with animal fat (from kererū, tītī, weka, tūī, or kiore) to preserve the fragrance. It was worn in a pouch next to the skin known as a hei-taramea, used to dress the hair, or rubbed directly on the body. It could also be stored in a hollow bone or bunch of feathers, and when warmed by body heat gave off a pleasant fragrance. The aromatic gum could be stored in a gourd or shell, and was a valuable trade good and gift. Taramea perfume is still prepared commercially by Ngāi Tahu, using a steam extraction method on hand-harvested leaves. A. aurea contains the non-volatile polyacetylene falcarindiol and the seeds contained steam-distilled volatiles such as heptanal and octanoic acid.

== Conservation ==
Many Aciphylla species are threatened by introduced mammals, such as domestic sheep, hares (which can eat the leaves from the side to avoid the spiny tips), and feral pigs (which will dig up plants to eat the carrot-like taproot). The decline of A. colensoi due to browsing from rabbits was noted as early as 1883. Widespread conversion of the New Zealand high country for sheep farming and pasture is also a threat to the group.

Aciphylla species have been suggested as useful indicators for measuring the effect of rabbits and hares on native plants; despite their spikes, the young leaves of Aciphylla are soft and vulnerable to browsing. In experimental plots that has been fenced for 30 years to exclude these lagomorphs, young Aciphylla aurea plants were 15 times as abundant as in nearby plots where only cattle and sheep were excluded; adult plants were 7 times as abundant.

== Pests and diseases ==
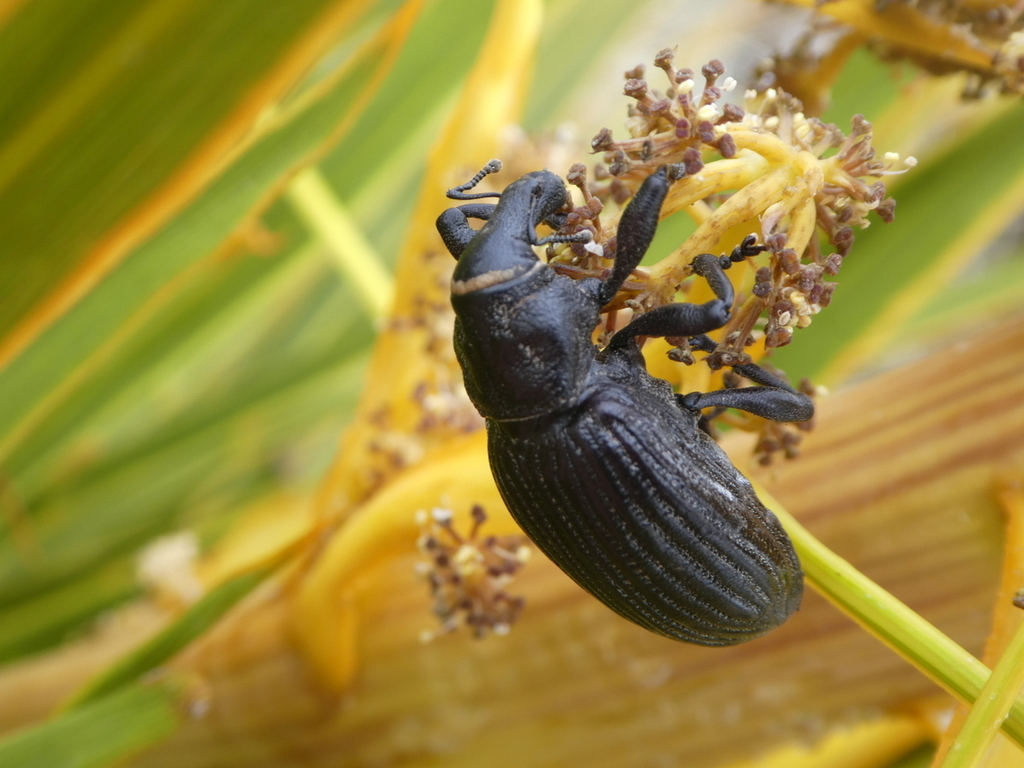
Lyperobius huttoni feeding on male A. squarrosa flower in the Blairich Range, Marlborough, New Zealand

Aciphylla squarrosa has a species of beetle, the speargrass weevil (Lyperobius huttoni), which completely depends on it for food: adults feed on the leaves and flower stalks, and larvae on the roots, although it appears to do little damage to adult speargrass. The decline of A. squarrosa on the mainland and predation by rats and mice had reduced the North Island L. huttoni population by the 2000s to around 150 individuals, living on cliffs of Wellington's south coast. A. squarrosa grows at low altitudes on both the south coast and nearby rodent-free Mana Island, so in 2006–2007 40 weevils were translocated to a speargrass patch on Mana, where they have bred successfully and spread.

In the Chatham Islands, Aciphylla dieffenbachii is the sole host of another endangered flightless weevil, Hadramphus spinipennis or coxella weevil. Both weevil and its host are threatened by browsing mammals.
