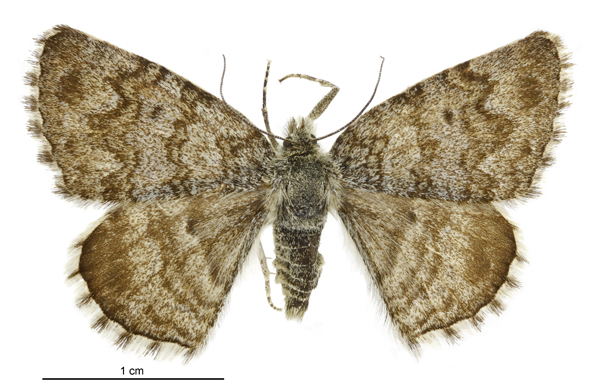
- Female
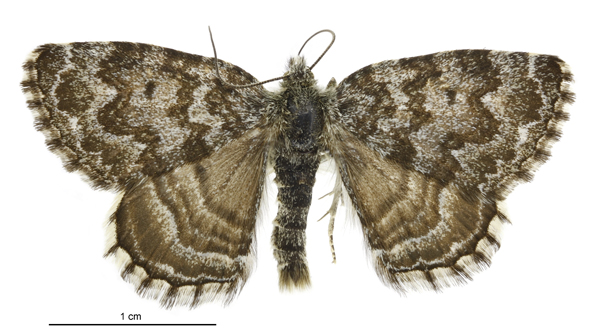
- Male

Scientific classification
- Kingdom: Animalia
- Phylum: Arthropoda
- Clade: Pancrustacea
- Class: Insecta
- Order: Lepidoptera
- Family: Geometridae
- Genus: Dasyuris
- Species: D. austrina

Binomial name
- Dasyuris austrina Philpott, 1928

= Dasyuris austrina =

Species of moth endemic to New Zealand

Dasyuris austrina is a species of moth in the family Geometridae. This species was first described by Alfred Philpott in 1928. It is endemic to New Zealand and is found in the South Island. It frequents fellfield habitat in subalpine to alpine zones at altitudes from 1200 to 1400 m. Adults are day flying and are on the wing from October until January. Adults likely pollinate the flowers of Gaultheria nubicola and Gentianella corymbifera. The larvae of this species are associated with Styphelia nesophila. and have also been found on species in the genus Anisotome.

== Taxonomy ==
This species was first described by Alfred Philpott in 1928. Later in 1928. George Hudson discussed this species as a small variety of D. hectori. In 1939 Hudson discussed this species as a synonym of Dasyuris hectori and stated that this view was shared by Edward Meyrick. In 1988 John S. Dugdale agreed with Philpott pointing out that D. austrina is distinct from D. hectori as its genitalia differs and there exists no intermedia forms to show a series of specimens that link the two species. The male holotype, collected by Alfred Philpott at Bold Peak in the Humboldt Mountains, is held at the New Zealand Arthropod Collection.

== Description ==
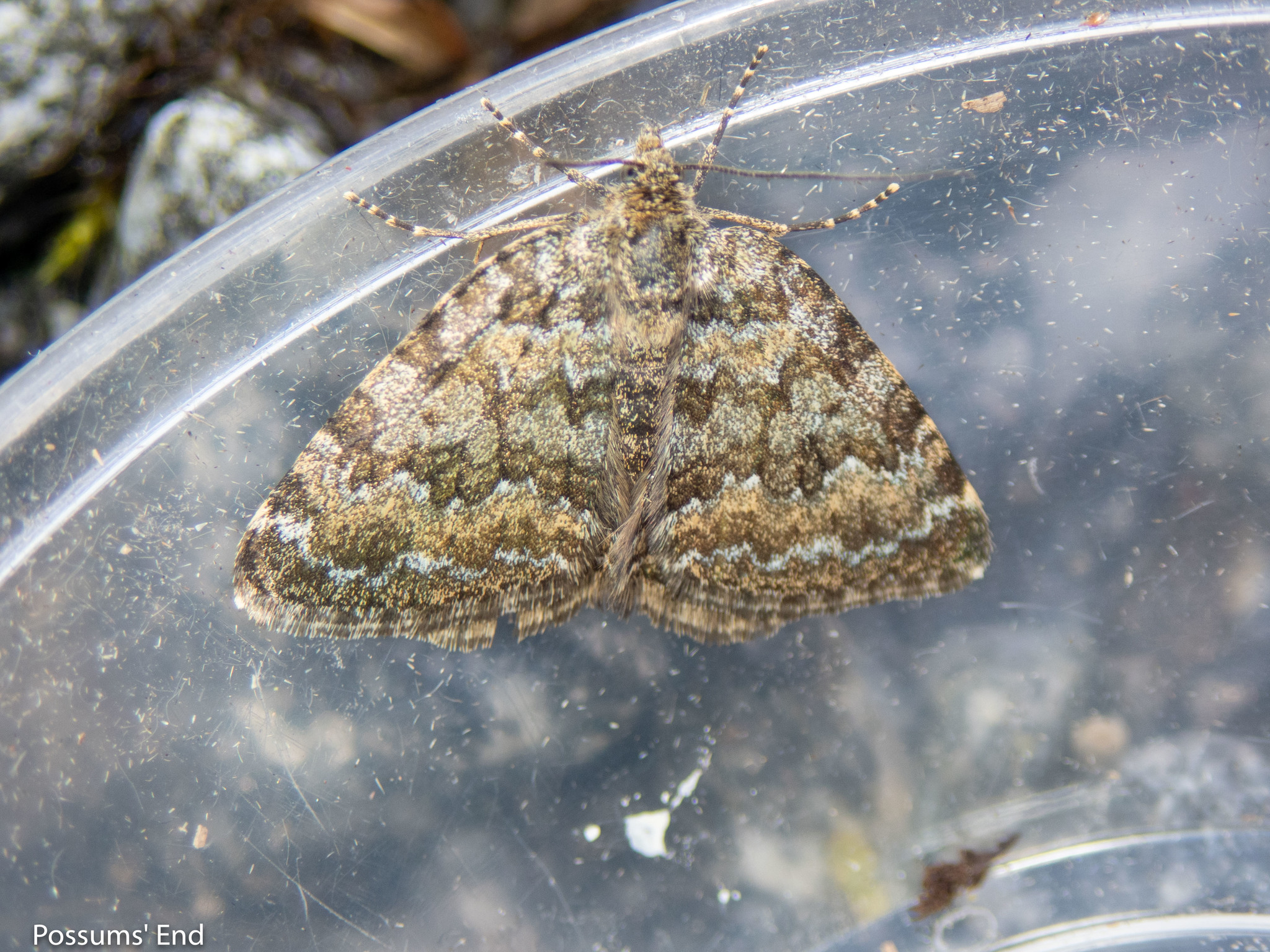
Living D. austrina.

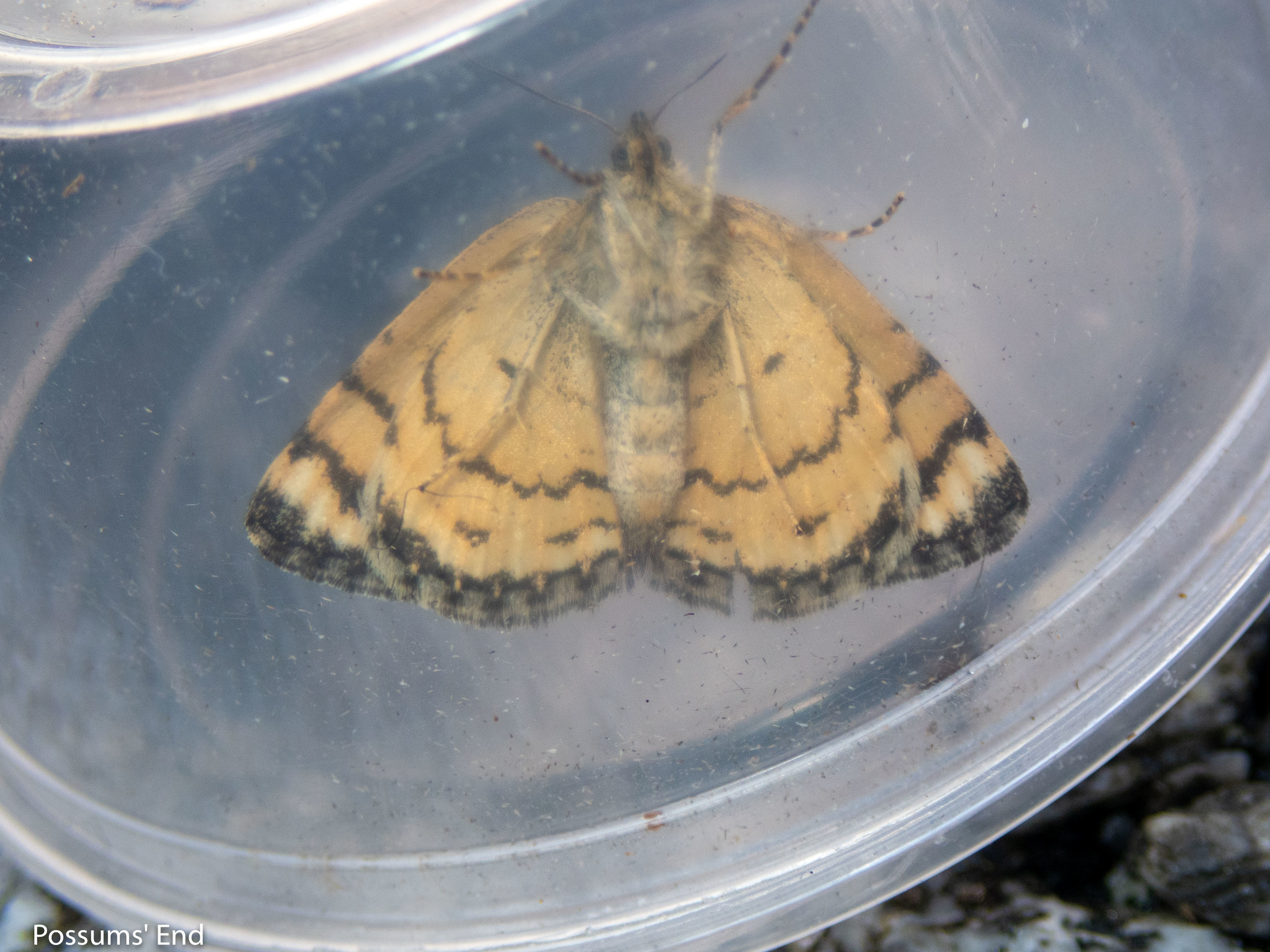
Underside of D. austrina.

Philpott described this species as follows:

♂. 30 mm. Head white densely mixed with black. Palpi ochreous-white mixed with black. Antennae greyish-black. Thorax and abdomen black mixed with whitish. Legs ochreous, strongly infuscated, tarsi annulated with ochreous. Forewings strongly arched at base, apex obtuse, termen slightly rounded, oblique; greyish-fuscous, densely irrorated with bluish-white on basal ⅔; an indistinct irregular basal line; first line at ⅓, irregularly dentate, fuscous; a round fuscous discal spot; second line at ⅔, fairly broad, fuscous, indented above and below middle, posteriorly margined with whitish; an obscure thin irregular subterminal white line: fringes white barred with fuscous and with a fuscous basal line. Hindwings coloured as forewings, all lines except basal present, but straighter than in forewings: fringes whitish mixed with fuscous, clear white round apex. Undersides ochreous-white with four thin lines and narrow terminal margin black.

Philpott pointed out that this species resembles D. hectori but is much smaller, paler in colour and has different undersides.

== Distribution ==
This species is endemic to New Zealand and has been observed in the South Island.

== Habitat and hosts ==
This species frequents fellfield habitat in subalpine to alpine zones at altitudes from 1200 to 1400 m. The larvae of this species are associated with Styphelia nesophila. Larvae have also been found on species in the genus Anisotome.

== Behaviour ==
Adults are on the wing from October until January. Adults have had Gaultheria nubicola and Gentianella corymbifera pollen collected from them, implying that adults of this moth species helps pollinate those plants.
