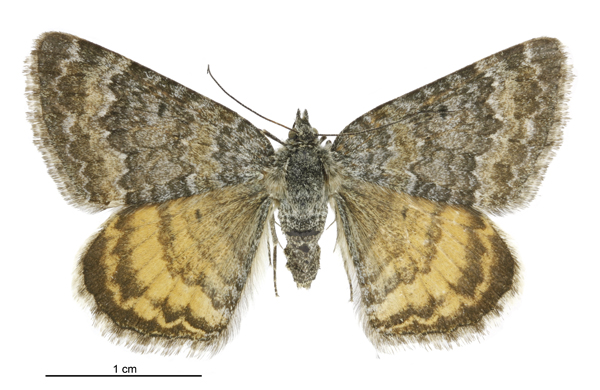
- Female
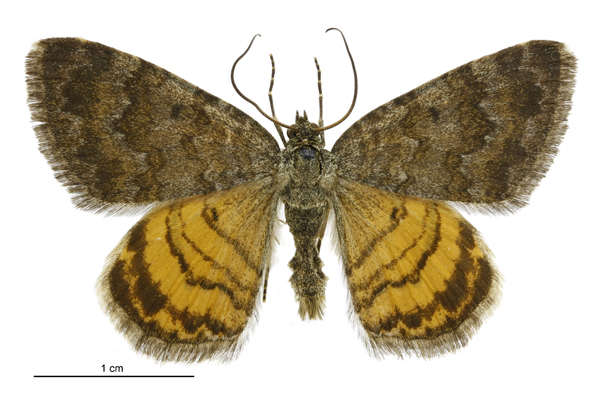
- Male

Scientific classification
- Kingdom: Animalia
- Phylum: Arthropoda
- Clade: Pancrustacea
- Class: Insecta
- Order: Lepidoptera
- Family: Geometridae
- Genus: Dasyuris
- Species: D. anceps

Binomial name
- Dasyuris anceps (Butler, 1877)

Synonyms
- Fidonia anceps Butler, 1877; Statira anceps (Butler, 1877); Stathmonyma anceps (Butler, 1877)

= Dasyuris anceps =

Species of moth endemic to New Zealand

Dasyuris anceps is a species of moth in the family Geometridae. It is endemic to New Zealand and is found in both the North and South Islands. This species can be found in rocky montane habitat and can be observed up to the alpine zone. Adults are day flying and are on the wing from December until February. The larval host plants for this moth are native species in the genera Aciphylla and Gingidia.

== Taxonomy ==
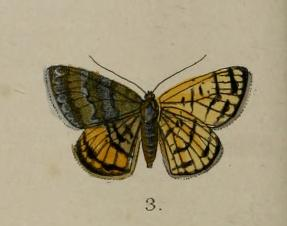
Illustration from first description.

This species was first described by Butler in 1877 and named Fidonia anceps. Edward Meyrick discussed this species under the name Statira anceps. George Hudson discussed and illustrated this species under the name Dasyuris anceps in his 1928 book The butterflies and moths of New Zealand. Louis Beethoven Prout discussed this species in 1939 and described a new subspecies. Hudson again discussed this species in his 1939 book A supplement to the butterflies and moths of New Zealand. In 1988 John S. Dugdale discussed the two subspecies of this species. In 2012 Robert Hoare in the New Zealand Inventory of Biodiversity appeared to raise the subspecies Dasyuris anceps grisescens to the species Dasyuris grisescens.

== Subspecies ==
- Dasyuris anceps anceps Butler, 1877
- Dasyuris anceps grisescens Prout, 1939

== Description ==
The hindwings of this species are coloured differently depending on whether they are found in the North or South Islands. South Island specimens have hind-wings coloured orange while North Island specimens lack this colouration.

Hudson, describing a South Island specimen, stated the following:

The expansion of the wings is 1 1/4 inches. All the wings are dark greyish-black, speckled with bluish-grey scales. The forewings have four or five rather indistinct wavy darker transverse lines, and a very broad darker shading near the termen; there is a fine white mark near the apex, continued as an indistinct wavy subterminal line. The hind-wings have three or four darker transverse bands, and a very broad terminal shading; there are also three or four more or less distinct whitish transverse lines; the cilia are whitish barred with dark grey. On the under side all the wings are dark blackish-grey, traversed by five or six broad wavy whitish lines.

The female holotype specimen was collected at Castle Hill in Canterbury by J. D. Enys and is held at the Natural History Museum in London.

Prout, when first describing D. a. grisescens, stated that:

... with almost the colouring of austrina, scarcely a suspicion of yellowish remaining on either surface, therefore requires a name, as at first sight it looks like a separate species; markings, however, typical.

The female holotype specimen for this subspecies was collected on Mount Hector in the Tararua Range by Hudson and is held at the Natural History Museum, London.

Dugdale, when discussing D. a. grisescens, stated that this subspecies lacks yellow colouration on the forewings and also

... has strong bands anterior to the median vein on the forewing underside.

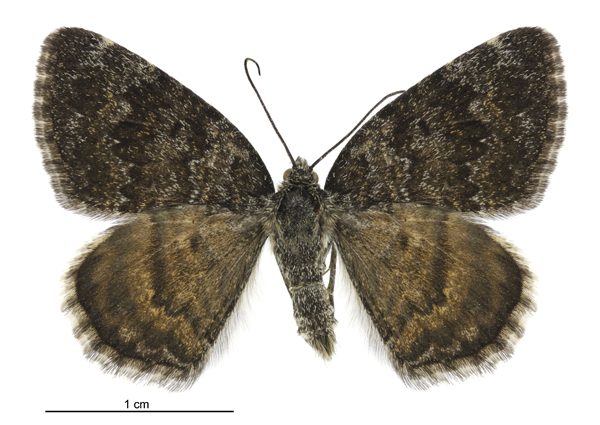
D. a. grisescens female

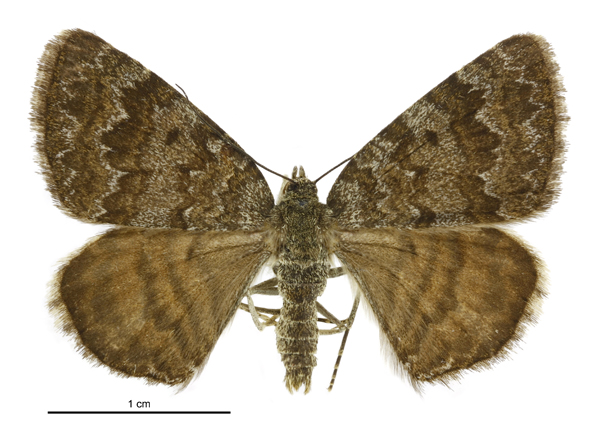
D. a. grisescens male

== Distribution ==
This species is endemic to New Zealand and is found in the North and South Islands.

== Habitat and hosts ==
D. anceps inhabits rocky montane habitat and can be observed up to the alpine zone. Larval hosts are plant species in the genera Aciphylla and Gingidia.

== Behaviour ==
Adults are day flying and are on the wing from December until February.
