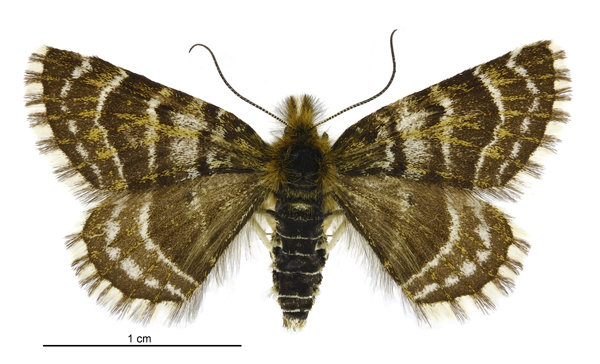
- Female
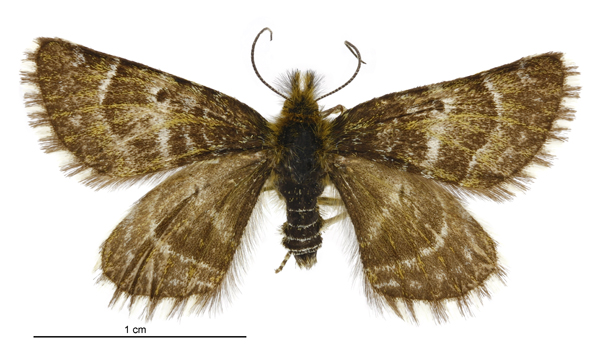
- Male

Scientific classification
- Kingdom: Animalia
- Phylum: Arthropoda
- Clade: Pancrustacea
- Class: Insecta
- Order: Lepidoptera
- Family: Geometridae
- Genus: Dasyuris
- Species: D. pluviata

Binomial name
- Dasyuris pluviata Hudson, 1928

= Dasyuris pluviata =

Species of moth endemic to New Zealand

Dasyuris pluviata is a species of moth in the family Geometridae. This species was first described by George Hudson in 1928. It is endemic to New Zealand and has been observed in the southern parts of the North Island including in the Tararua and Ruahine ranges. The species inhabits tussock grassland. Adult moths are day flying and have been collected in November.

== Taxonomy ==
This species was first described by George Hudson in his 1928 book The butterflies and moths of New Zealand. The male lectotype, collected by Stella Hudson at Field Peak in the Tararua Ranges, is held at Te Papa.

== Description ==
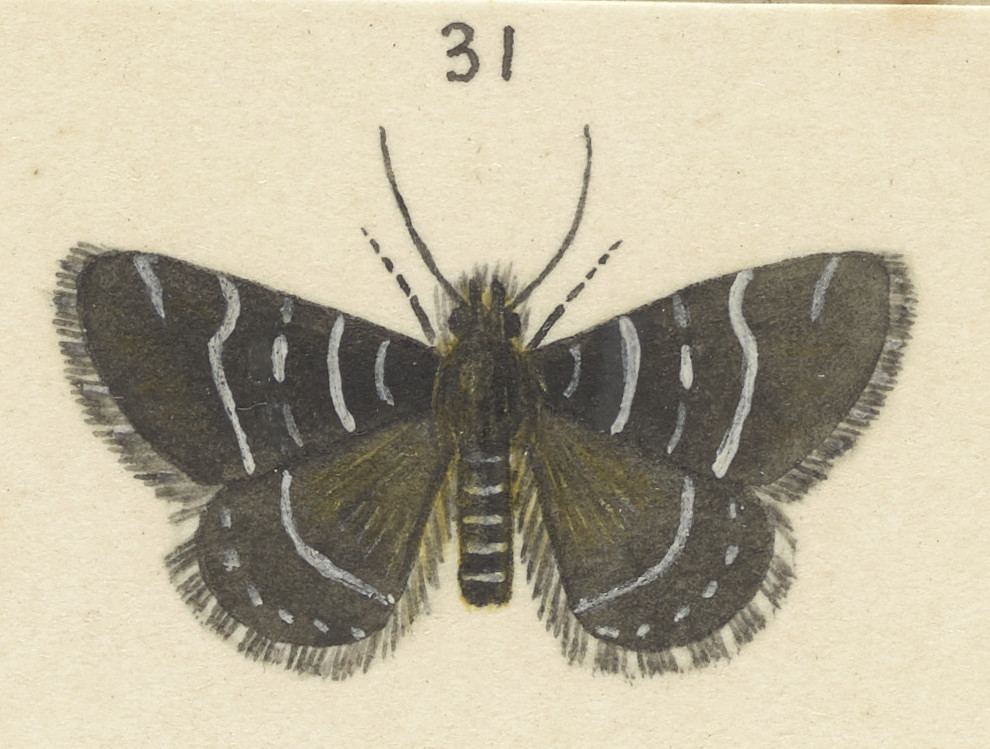
Illustration of male by Hudson.

Hudson described this species as follows:

The expansion of the wings of the male is 1 inch. The fore-wings are smoky-black with very fine curved whitish markings; a very obscure basal line; the first line is gently outwards-curved, running from about 1/8 of the costa to 1/4 of dorsum; a faint outwards-curved median line, extending above and below the discal mark; second line slightly bent inwards below costa at two-thirds, strongly bowed outwards to before disc, thence running almost straight to dorsum at three-quarters; there is a faint indication of a subterminal line on costa at about 7/8 and a few scattered yellow scales on some of the principal veins. The hind-wings are pale smoky-grey; a continuous fine whitish line below middle, meeting dorsum slightly above tornus, and a series of fine whitish subterminal marks; all the cilia are smoky-grey, barred with whitish on hind-wings only. The head and thorax are clothed with long black and yellow hairs; the abdomen is black, with segmental divisions marked in white. On the underside the fore-wings are pale grey, with the costal and apical areas broadly bordered with yellow; discal patch white with two diffused black dots; second line broad, white, bordered with blackish towards base; a subterminal series of confluent white spots. The underside of the hind-wings is almost entirely yellow; discal area white; a broad white transverse line below middle, irregularly edged with blackish towards base; a rather irregular broad white subterminal line; the veins on the undersurface are marked in yellow.

Although this species resembles D. fulminea, it lacks the distinctive angulated median line of that later species. D. pluviata also has more slender lines on the upper surface of its wings in comparison to D. fulminea.

== Distribution ==
This species is endemic to New Zealand. D. pluviata has been observed in the southern half of the North Island. Hudson stated that as well as the type locality this species has been observed in the Ruahine Range.

== Habitat ==
This species inhabits tussock grassland.

== Behaviour ==
Adults of this species are day flying and have been collected in November.
