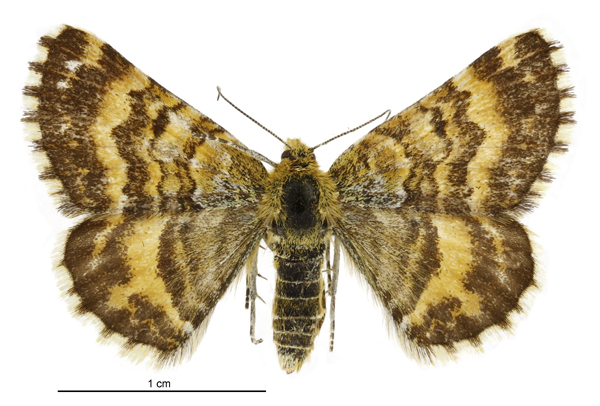
- Female
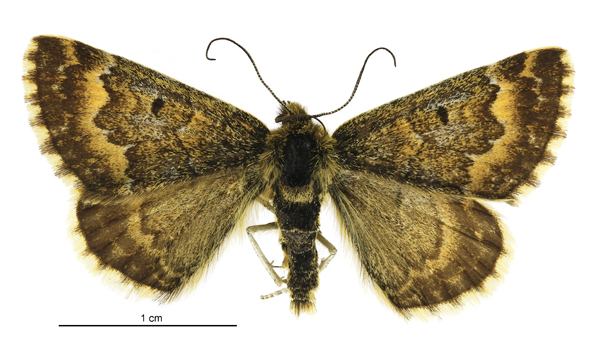
- Male

Scientific classification
- Kingdom: Animalia
- Phylum: Arthropoda
- Clade: Pancrustacea
- Class: Insecta
- Order: Lepidoptera
- Family: Geometridae
- Genus: Dasyuris
- Species: D. catadees

Binomial name
- Dasyuris catadees Prout, 1939

= Dasyuris catadees =

Species of moth endemic to New Zealand

Dasyuris catadees is a species of moth in the family Geometridae. This species was first described by Louis Beethoven Prout in 1939. It is endemic to New Zealand and has been observed in the Tasman District, in Fiordland and in Southland. This species inhabits the high alpine zone and adults have been collected in January and March. Larvae feed on Aciphylla.

== Taxonomy ==
This species was first described by Louis Beethoven Prout in 1939. This male holotype specimen, collected by George Hudson at Mount Peel in the Kahurangi National Park, is held at the Natural History Museum, London.

== Description ==
Prout described this species as follows:

... has the areole simple on the right forewing, double — though with the distal very small (2nd. subcostal stalked) — on the left, the orange parts paler, almost white, the outer band very slender, on the hindwing curving more slightly; underside also whitish, the presubterminal dark band of the forewing broadened from 2nd. subcostal to 3rd. radial and again at the medians.

This species is similar in appearance to D. partheniata.

== Distribution ==
This species is endemic to New Zealand. Other than its type locality in the Nelson/Tasman Region, this species has also been observed in the Homer area, the Hump Ridge Track, the Hunter Mountains and the Murchison Mountains, all in Fiordland, as well as the Takitimu Mountains in Southland.

== Habitat and host species ==
This species inhabits the high alpine zone. The larval plant hosts for this species are in the genus Aciphylla.

== Behaviour ==
Adults of this species are day flying and have been collected in January and March.
