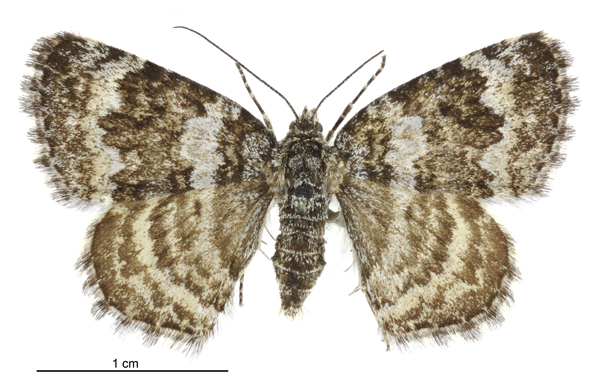
- Female
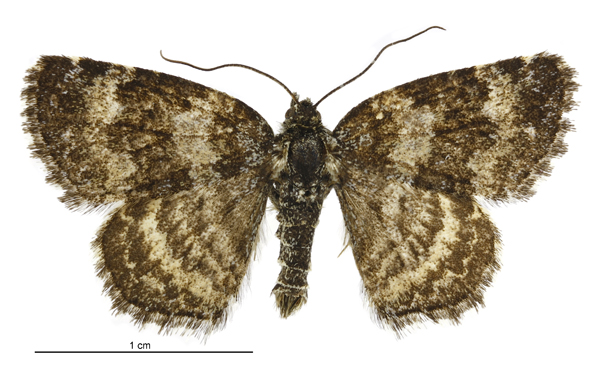
- Male

Scientific classification
- Kingdom: Animalia
- Phylum: Arthropoda
- Class: Insecta
- Order: Lepidoptera
- Family: Geometridae
- Genus: Dasyuris
- Species: D. octans

Binomial name
- Dasyuris octans Hudson, 1923

= Dasyuris octans =

Species of moth

Dasyuris octans is a species of moth in the family Geometridae. It is endemic to New Zealand. This moth is classified as "At Risk, Naturally Uncommon" by the Department of Conservation.

== Taxonomy ==
This species was first described by George Hudson in 1923 using a specimen discovered by Stewart Lindsay in the Hunter Mountains near Lake Manapouri at 4000 ft. Hudson described and illustrated the species in his 1928 publication The Butterflies and Moths of New Zealand. The lectotype is held at the Museum of New Zealand Te Papa Tongarewa.

== Description ==
Hudson described the species as follows:

The expansion of the wings is slightly under 1 inch. All the wings are extremely pale orange-ochreous with black markings. The fore-wings have the apex rather rounded and the termen somewhat bowed outwards; there is a small white basal patch speckled with black; beyond this are two dentate transverse lines abruptly bent inwards below costa; between this and the median band there is a broad band of the ground-colour; the median band is narrow with marked constrictions below costa and above dorsum, these constrictions being deepest on the outer edge of the band; the black lines forming the median band are very indefinite strongly dentate, the centre of the band is heavily sprinkled with white scales; the terminal area is broadly suffused with black; broadest towards apex; there are many white scales interspersed with the black and traces of a wavy whitish subterminal line; a terminal series of black marks. All the cilia are cream-coloured barred with black. The hind-wings have an oblique blackish basal patch speckled with white; two wavy blackish transverse bands on the median area; a very broad black terminal band, partially transversed by a fine wavy subterminal line. The head, thorax, and abdomen are black, thickly speckled with white scales.

This species can be mistaken for Dasyuris hectori but can be distinguished from that species as D. octans is smaller, much narrower and has a more orange-ocherous tint.

== Distribution ==
This species is endemic to New Zealand. Along with the type locality, this species has been collected at Homer, as well as at the Rahine Range, Kaikōura Ranges, Jack's Pass in Hanmer, Porters Pass, Mount Cook, Macetown, Vanguard Peak and Advance Peak in Otago, Kepler Mountains and Eglinton Valley at Milford Sound.

== Biology and life cycle ==
This species is on the wing in December. It is a day flying moth.

== Host plant and habitat ==
Charles E. Clarke notes he captured specimens flying over lichen covered rocks in native grass and herb habitat.

== Conservation status ==
This moth is classified under the New Zealand Threat Classification system as being "At Risk, Naturally Uncommon".
