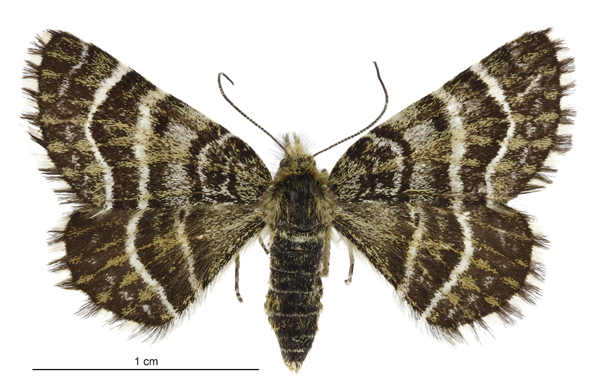
- Female
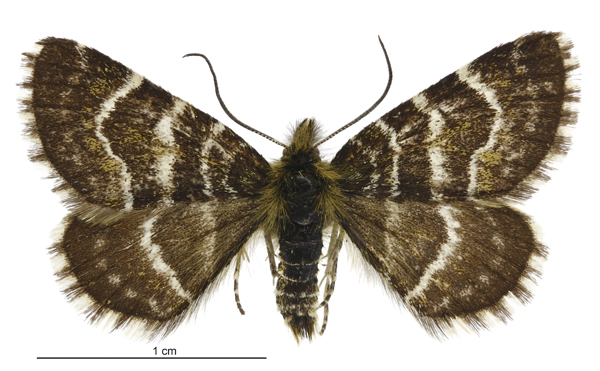
- Male

Conservation status
- Declining (NZ TCS)

Scientific classification
- Kingdom: Animalia
- Phylum: Arthropoda
- Clade: Pancrustacea
- Class: Insecta
- Order: Lepidoptera
- Family: Geometridae
- Genus: Dasyuris
- Species: D. leucobathra

Binomial name
- Dasyuris leucobathra Meyrick, 1911

= Dasyuris leucobathra =

Species of moth endemic to New Zealand

Dasyuris leucobathra is a species of moth in the family Geometridae. This species was first described by Edward Meyrick in 1911. It is endemic to New Zealand and has been observed in the South Island. This species inhabits grassland in the alpine zone and frequents open sunny areas. Adults are day flying and are on the wing in December and January. Larvae have been observed feeding on species in the plant genus Anisotome.

== Taxonomy ==
D. leucobathra was first described by Edward Meyrick in 1911 first in error as Notoreas leucobathra but corrected to Dasyuris leucobathra in the footnotes of the same publication. George Hudson discussed and illustrated this species in his 1928 book The butterflies and moths of New Zealand. The female lectotype, collected at Arthur's Pass by Hudson, is held at the Natural History Museum, London.

== Description ==
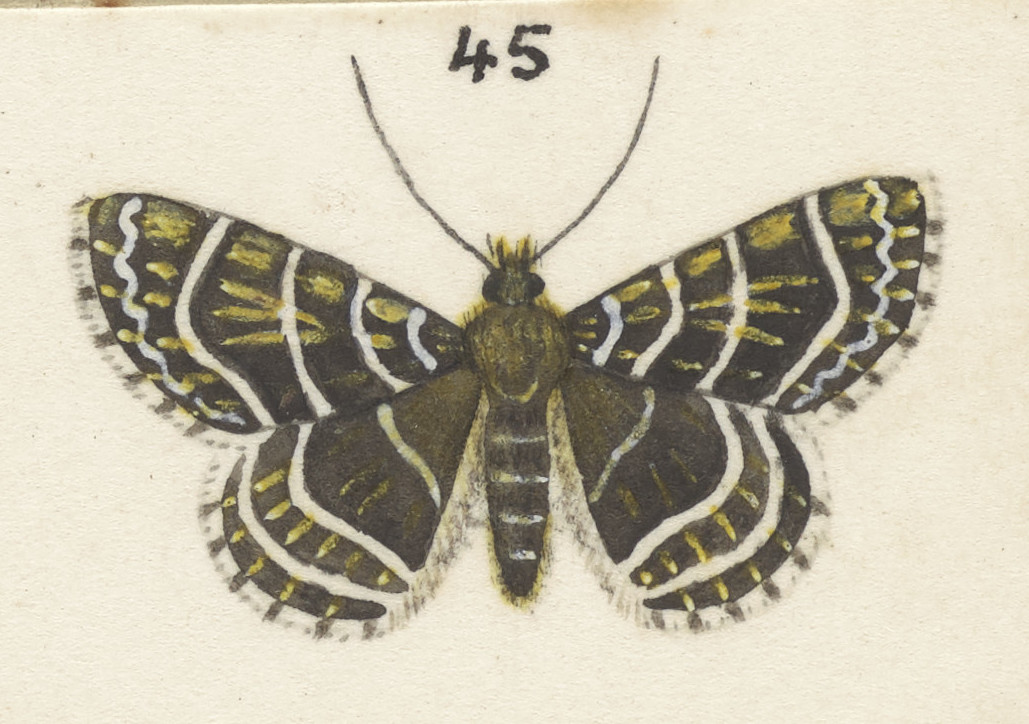
Hudson's illustration of female.

Meyrick described this species as follows

♀. 21-25 mm. Head and palpi yellowish mixed with blackish hairs. Thorax blackish, patagia light-yellowish with some black hairs. Abdomen black, sides suffused with yellow, segmental margins slenderly white. Forewings triangular, costa faintly sinuate, apex obtuse, termen rounded, rather oblique ; grey, suffusedly irrorated with blackish, and much mixed with bronzy-yellowish, especially on veins ; lines moderately thick, white, sub-basal and first more slender, curved, median straight or somewhat angulated in middle, second slightly curved outwards on upper 3/4, sometimes rounded-angulated in middle, subterminal formed of a waved series of marks or reduced to a short mark from costa : cilia white, barred with grey mixed with blackish. Hindwings with termen rounded ; colour and markings as in forewings, but lines sometimes pale ochreous-yellowish, subbasal and first absent, second more curved, subterminal forming a series of cloudy marks : cilia as in forewings.

This species can be distinguished on the basis of the cilia which are coloured with black and white bars to the base where as other species in this genus have cilia which are wholly dark for the basal half.

== Distribution ==
This species is endemic to New Zealand and can be found in the South Island.

== Habitat and hosts ==
This species inhabits grassland in the alpine zone and frequents open sunny areas. Larvae of this moth have been observed feeding on species in the genus Anisotome.

== Behaviour ==
Adults are day flying and have been observed in December and January.

== Conservation status ==
In 2025 this moth was classified under the New Zealand Threat Classification system as being "At Risk, Declining" as a result of being impacted by climate change, having poor data for both population size and trend of decline. It is also threatened as a result of weed invasion.
