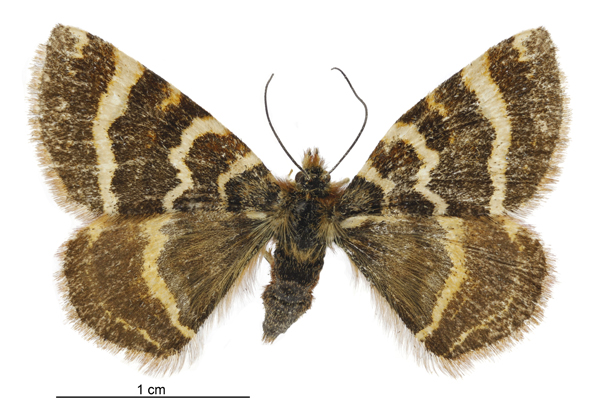
- Female
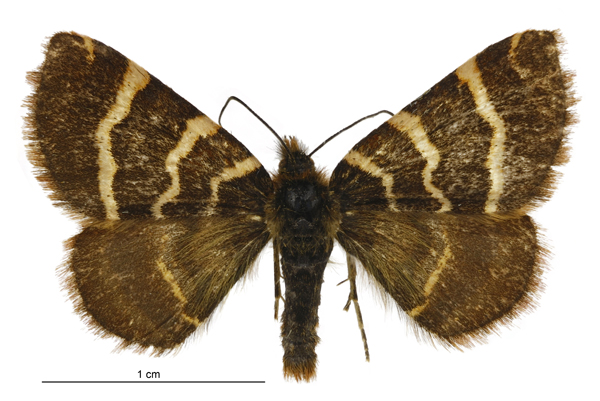
- Male

Conservation status
- Data Deficit (NZ TCS)

Scientific classification
- Kingdom: Animalia
- Phylum: Arthropoda
- Clade: Pancrustacea
- Class: Insecta
- Order: Lepidoptera
- Family: Geometridae
- Genus: Dasyuris
- Species: D. fulminea

Binomial name
- Dasyuris fulminea Philpott, 1915

= Dasyuris fulminea =

Species of moth endemic to New Zealand

Dasyuris fulminea is a species of moth in the family Geometridae. It was first described by Alfred Philpott and is endemic to New Zealand. It has been observed in the regions of the West Coast, Fiordland and Otago. Adults are day flying and are on the wing from December until February. In 2025 this species was classified as "data deficient" under the New Zealand Threat Classification System by the Department of Conservation.

== Taxonomy ==
D. fulminea was first described by Alfred Philpott in 1915 using a male specimen collected by George Howes on Bold Peak in Otago in February. George Hudson discussed and illustrated this species in his 1928 book The butterflies and moths of New Zealand. The holotype specimen is held at Te Papa.

== Description ==
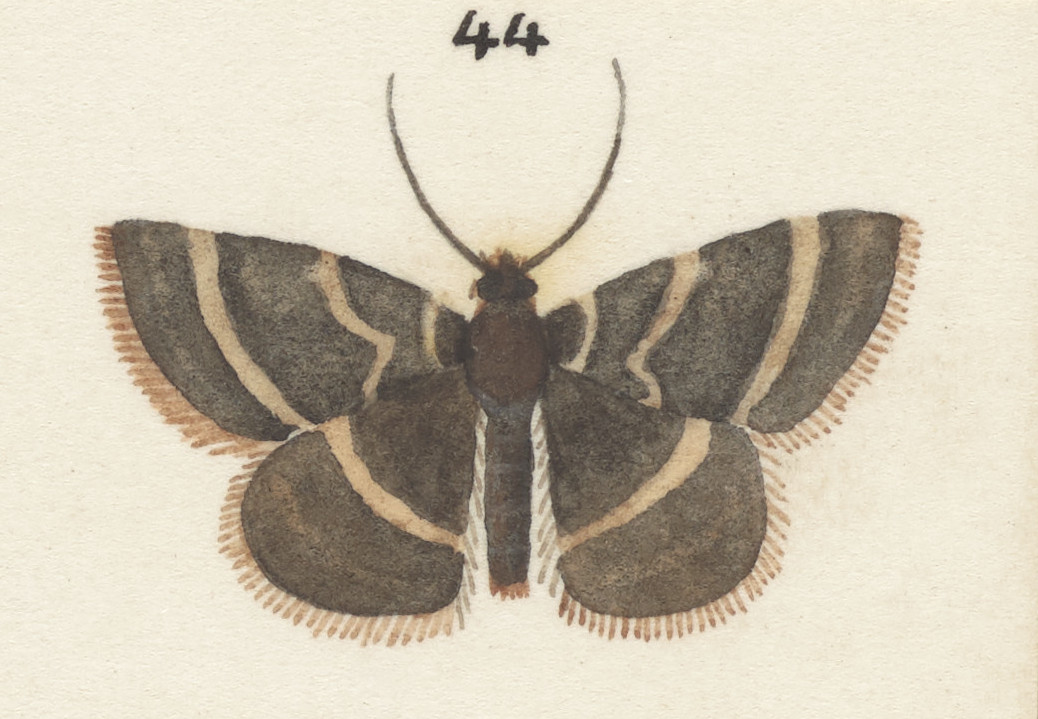
Illustration by George Hudson.

Philpott originally described this species as follows:

♂. 24 mm. Head black. Palpi densely haired, dark yellowish-brown. Antennae (broken). Thorax black with some yellow - brown scales. Abdomen black with yellow and grey scales, anal tuft yellowish. Forewings short, costa somewhat arched at base, very slightly deflexed at apex, termen rather strongly rounded; deep blackish-fuscous finely irrorated with yellow; fasciae pale yellowish-white (probably bright yellow in fresh specimens); basal fascia distinct, curved; first fascia from ⅓, broadest on costal half, with a sharp deep serration inwards below middle; second fascia broad, very slightly sinuate and becoming narrow near dorsum; traces of a narrow orange fascia on costa at middle and before apex: cilia orange. Hindwings dark fuscous irrorated with yellow; a prominent median yellow fascia, becoming narrow and bending inwardly on dorsum; an obscure irregular yellow subterminal line: cilia orange. Undersides: Forewings brownish-orange; upper lines partially reproduced and suffusedly margined with fuscous; several bright orange-brown blotches on costa hindwings brownish-orange; an outwardly oblique irregular white median fascia; a pale subterminal line.

This species is similar in appearance to Dasyuris callicrena but can be distinguished as the lines on the forewings differ between the two species and the cilia of D. fulminea are only of one colour unlike those of D. callicrena.

== Distribution ==
This species is endemic to New Zealand. Along with the type locality of Bold Peak, this species has also been observed in Fiordland as well as in the mountains in the West Coast.

== Behaviour ==
The adults of this species are day flying moths and are on the wing from December to February.

== Conservation status ==
In 2025 this species was classified by the New Zealand Department of Conservation as "data deficient" under the New Zealand Threat Classification System as a result of the difficulty in identifying the species.
