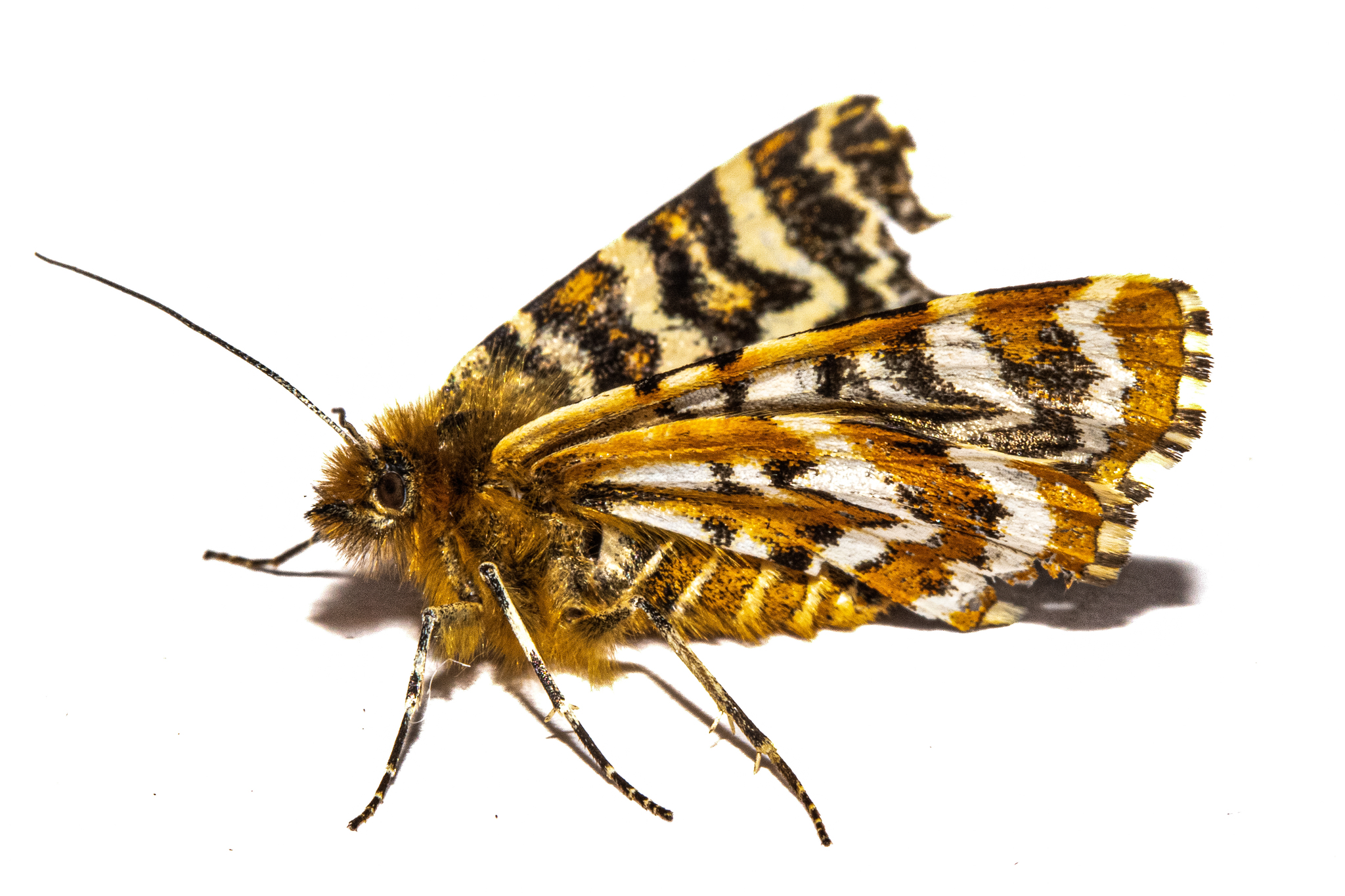

Scientific classification
- Kingdom: Animalia
- Phylum: Arthropoda
- Clade: Pancrustacea
- Class: Insecta
- Order: Lepidoptera
- Family: Geometridae
- Genus: Dasyuris
- Species: D. strategica

Binomial name
- Dasyuris strategica (Meyrick, 1883)

Synonyms
- Pasithea strategica Meyrick, 1883; Notoreas strategica (Meyrick, 1883)

= Dasyuris strategica =

Species of moth endemic to New Zealand

Dasyuris strategica is a species of moth in the family Geometridae. This species was first described by Edward Meyrick in 1883. It is endemic to New Zealand and occurs in the northern half of the South Island. Adults of this species are on the wing in December and January.

== Taxonomy ==
This species was first described by Edward Meyrick in 1883 and originally named Pasithea strategica. In 1884 Meyrick gave a fuller description of this species. George Hudson first discussed and illustrated this species under the name Notoreas strategica in 1898 in his book New Zealand moths and butterflies (Macro-lepidoptera). He subsequently discussed and illustrated this species under the name Dasyuris strategica in his 1928 book The butterflies and moths of New Zealand. The male holotype specimen, collected at Lake Guyon by W. T. L. Travers, is held at the Canterbury Museum.

== Description ==
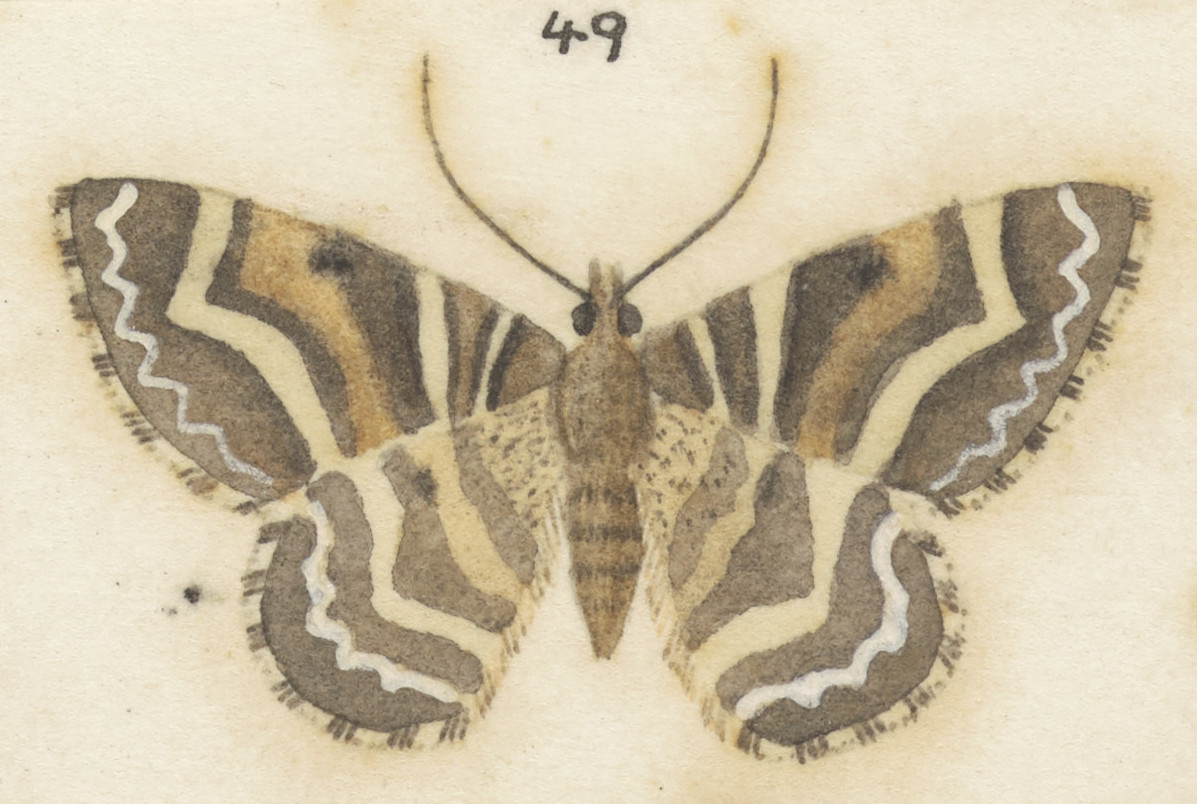
Illustration by Hudson of female.

Meyrick described this species as follows:

Female.—35 mm. Forewings moderate, hindmargin rounded ; dark fuscous, thinly irrorated with yellowish; a slender straight oblique white fascia towards base ; a narrow somewhat irregular slightly curved white fascia before middle; a narrow whitish median fascia, broadly suffused with yellowish, bent above middle ; a rather narrow well-defined white fascia beyond middle, sharply angulated in disc; a sharply dentate white subterminal line; cilia barred with white and dark fuscous. Hindwings moderate, hindmargin rounded ; dark fuscous, base irrorated with yellowish ; a somewhat sinuate whitish fascia suffused with yellowish before middle; a white strongly angulated fascia beyond middle ; subterminal line and cilia as in forewings. Hindwings beneath suffused with golden-yellow.

Hudson described this species as follows:

The expansion of the wings is 1 3/8 inches. The fore-wings are dull yellowish-grey, becoming blackish along the edges of the transverse lines which are cream-coloured; there are two narrow bands near the base, the first outwardly oblique towards the dorsum, the second slightly curved; a dull orange shading in the centre of the median band, followed by a broad cream-coloured band very strongly angulated above the middle; there is a very wavy subterminal line. The hind-wings are dull yellowish-grey near the base, becoming blackish towards the termen; there is a small cream-coloured area near the base, then two rather broad, slightly irregular cream-coloured bands, and a rather fine wavy white subterminal line. The cilia of all the wings are white, barred with blackish-brown.

== Distribution ==
This species is endemic to New Zealand and occurs in the northern half of the South Island.

== Behaviour ==
Adults are on the wing in December and January.
