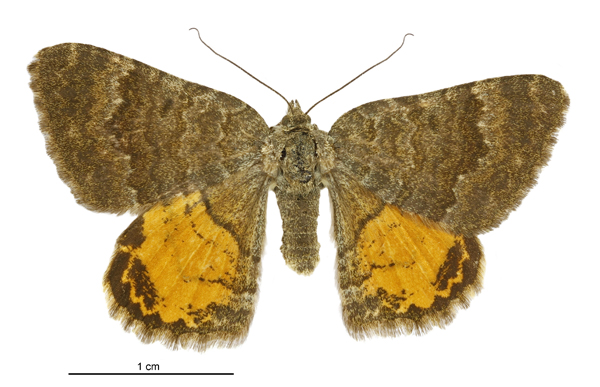
- Female
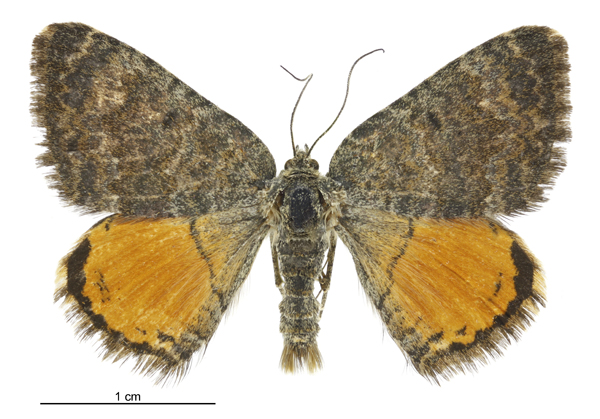
- Male

Scientific classification
- Kingdom: Animalia
- Phylum: Arthropoda
- Clade: Pancrustacea
- Class: Insecta
- Order: Lepidoptera
- Family: Geometridae
- Genus: Dasyuris
- Species: D. enysii

Binomial name
- Dasyuris enysii (Butler, 1877)

Synonyms
- Fidonia enysii Butler, 1877; Statira homomorpha Meyrick 1884; Statira enysii (Butler, 1877); Stathmonyma enysii (Butler, 1877)

= Dasyuris enysii =

Species of moth

Dasyuris enysii is a species of moth in the family Geometridae. It is endemic to New Zealand. This moth is classified as "At Risk, Naturally Uncommon" by the Department of Conservation.

== Taxonomy ==
This species was first described by Arthur Gardiner Butler in 1877 using specimens collected by John Enys and named Fidonia enysii. In 1884 Edward Meyrick, thinking he was describing a new species, named it Statira homomorpha. In 1885 Meyrick recognised his error and synonymised both previous names naming the species Statira enysii. In 1886 Meyrick renamed the genus Statira Stathmonyma. George Hudson described and illustrated the species under the name Dasyuris enysii both in his 1898 book New Zealand moths and butterflies (Macrolepidoptera) as well as in his 1928 publication The Butterflies and Moths of New Zealand. The type specimen of this species is held at the Natural History Museum, London.

== Description ==
Butler described the species as follows:

Primaries above pale grey, crossed by sandy yellowish, white, and dark grey bars and lines, some of which form an irregular darker central band; outer border broadly dark grey, bounded internally by a lunulated sandy stripe and intersected by a pale line; fringe alternately pale brown and whitish; secondaries bright orange; abdominal area speckled with blackish; a subbasal transverse blackline; outer border dentated, black; fringe alternately brown and whitish; body grey : wings below bright ochreous, crossed by several black lines, much as in the preceding species; outer border black, intersected by a crenated yellow stripe, which in the secondaries unites with the ground-colour at the apex and in the second median interspace; pectus white, venter creamy whitish. Expanse of wings 1 inch 4 lines.

When on the wing this species can be mistaken for Paranotoreas brephosata but can be distinguished from that species as D. enysii is larger in size, has paler colouring and the antennae of the male is simpler.

== Distribution ==
This species is endemic to New Zealand. The range of D. enysii is Marlborough, Kaikōura and Mid Canterbury. The type locality is Castle Hill. Hudson stated that he collected specimens at the mineral belt on Dun Mountain near Nelson as well as at Mount Hutt.

== Biology and life cycle ==
Little is known of the biology and life cycle of this species. The adults of this species are on the wing in January and are day flying.

== Host species and habitat ==
The host species for the larvae of this moth is unknown but it has been hypothesised that it is likely to be a plant from the family Apiaceae. The adults of this species prefer stony mountainous habitat.

== Conservation status ==
This moth is classified under the New Zealand Threat Classification system as being "At Risk, Naturally Uncommon".
