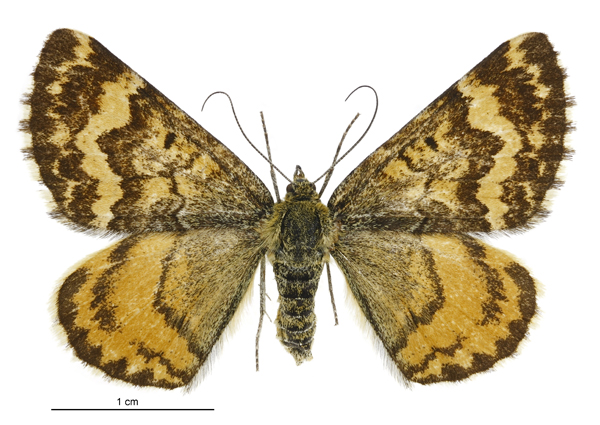
- Female
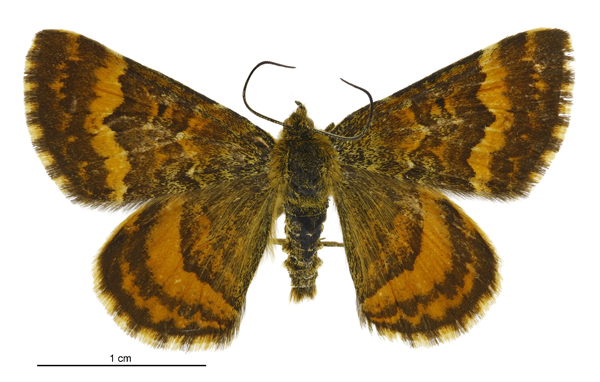
- Male

Conservation status
- Declining (NZ TCS)

Scientific classification
- Kingdom: Animalia
- Phylum: Arthropoda
- Clade: Pancrustacea
- Class: Insecta
- Order: Lepidoptera
- Family: Geometridae
- Genus: Dasyuris
- Species: D. partheniata

Binomial name
- Dasyuris partheniata Guenée, 1868

= Dasyuris partheniata =

Species of moth endemic to New Zealand

Dasyuris partheniata is a species of moth in the family Geometridae. It was first described by Achille Guenée in 1868. D. partheniata is endemic to New Zealand and is found in the North and South Islands. This species inhabits open grass areas including tussock grassland as well as coastal cliffs. It can be found at altitudes ranging from sea level up to 1350 m. The adults of this species are day flying and are on the wing from October to March. Larvae are nocturnal and feed on species in the genus Aciphylla including Aciphylla subflabellata and Aciphylla squarrosa. As at 2015 this species is classified as "At Risk, Declining" by the Department of Conservation.

== Taxonomy ==
This species was first described by Achille Guenée in 1868 from a specimen collected by Richard William Fereday in Canterbury. Edward Meyrick also gave a description of this species. George Vernon Hudson discussed and illustrated the species in multiple publications including in 1898, in 1928 and in 1939. He stated that Fereday's specimens were collected at the foot of Mount Hutt. The holotype specimen is held at the Natural History Museum, London.

== Description ==
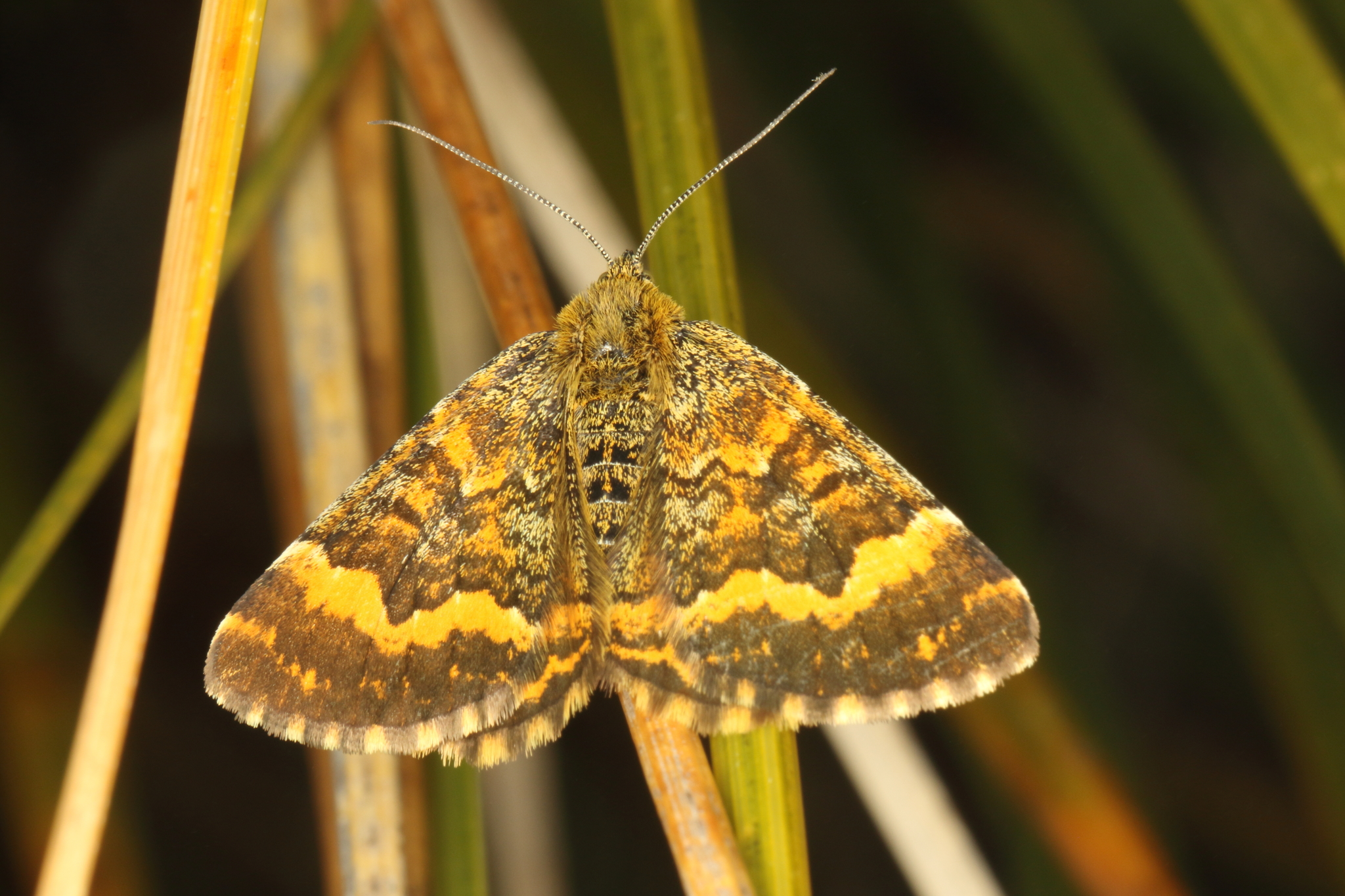
Living specimen of D. partheniata.

The eggs of this species are yellowish-white in appearance, elliptical in shape and have hexagonal depressions on the surface.

Larvae are coloured pale yellow-brown on their dorsal side and a dull ocherous shade on their lateral side. They have 16 legs and are extremely thin. Hudson described the larva of D. partheniata as follows:

The length of the full-grown larva is about 1 1/8 inches. Very light brown; a narrow paler dorsal region, irregularly edged with black; light blackish-brown dorsal line, edged with black; pale ochreous subdorsal line, also edged with black, becoming creamy-yellow on posterior segments; dark brown lateral line, edged above with black; broad creamyyellow lateral line; short dark hairs; spiracles pale ochreous, finely ringed with black; sublateral surface pale cinnamon; ventral surface very pale; dark brown and pale grey ventral lines, slightly tinged with black. Head rather small, whitish, marked with brown.

Hudson pointed out that there is considerable variation in depth of colouring of larvae specimens. In some specimens the subdorsal line continues to be ochreous on posterior segments; in others the dark brown lateral line is rather broad; the lateral line is also sometimes very pale yellow and some specimens are tinged grey green.

The pupa is approximately 1 1/4 cm long and is initially coloured pale yellow but darkens to golden then dark brown.

Hudson described the adults of the species as follows:

The expansion of the wings is about 1 1/8 inches. The fore-wings are bright orange-yellow; the base is speckled with black and dull green scales; there is a rather indistinct band at about one-third; a broad wavy dark brown band a little beyond the middle, with a projection towards the termen, followed by a clear space and another broad irregular dark transverse band; the termen is broadly bordered with dark brown, which is often almost continuous with the last-named transverse band. The hind-wings are bright orange; there is a large speckled area near the base edged with a curved black line, followed by a clear space, and an interrupted dark brown transverse line considerably beyond the middle; the termen is rather narrowly edged with a dark brown line, wavy towards the base of the wing. The cilia of all the wings are yellow barred with black.

== Distribution ==
D. partheniata is endemic to New Zealand. It occurs from the southern parts of the North Island southwards. This species has been observed at Waiouru, the Tararua Range including at Mount Holdsworth, Wellington, Mount Arthur, Mount Hutt, Arthur's Pass National Park, Homer, Mount Cook, Dunedin, Lake Wakatipu, and at the Hump Ridge. The species can occur from sea level up to approximately 1500m in altitude.

== Behaviour ==
The adults of this species are day flying moths and are on the wing during the months of October to March.

The larvae of D. partheniata have been collected in May and can be difficult to detect amongst the needle like leaves of its host. The larvae eat in long sections, often right through the blade, leaving the veins of the leaves untouched. They are nocturnal and when their safety is threatened drop to the centre of the plants they are feeding on. The larvae of this species have been observed, in the present of a Ichneumon wasp, gripping the blade of its food plant with its prolegs and beating it with its body, causing the blade to move from side to side.

== Habitat ==
The species occurs in open grassy areas up to altitudes of 1350 m. In Wellington the species prefers coastal cliffs and at Mount Hutt specimens have been collected in tussock grass.

== Host species ==
The larval host plants of this species are in the genus Aciphylla and include Aciphylla subflabellata and Aciphylla squarrosa.

== Conservation status ==
This moth is classified under the New Zealand Threat Classification system as being At Risk and Declining.
