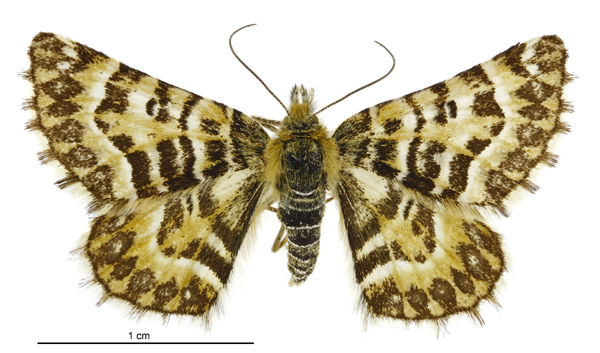
- Female
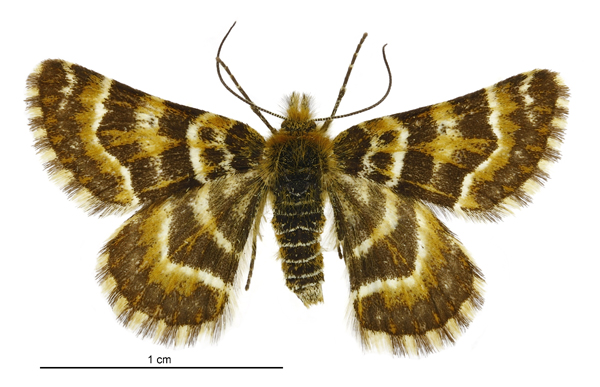
- Male

Scientific classification
- Kingdom: Animalia
- Phylum: Arthropoda
- Clade: Pancrustacea
- Class: Insecta
- Order: Lepidoptera
- Family: Geometridae
- Genus: Dasyuris
- Species: D. transaurea

Binomial name
- Dasyuris transaurea Howes, 1912

Synonyms
- Dasyuris transaureus Howes, 1912

= Dasyuris transaurea =

Species of moth endemic to New Zealand

Dasyuris transaurea is a species of moth in the family Geometridae. It is endemic to New Zealand and is found in the southern parts of the South Island. This species inhabits montane grassland. Adults are day flying and are on the wing from November until January. The larval host for this species is Anisotome aromatica.

== Taxonomy ==
This species was first described by George Howes in 1912 and named Dasyuris transaureus. George Hudson discussed and illustrated this species under that name in his 1928 book The butterflies and moths of New Zealand. The male lectotype, collected by Howes at the Garvie mountains in Otago, is held at the Natural History Museum, London.

== Description ==
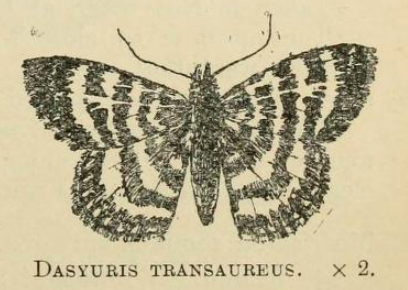
D. transaureus by Howes.

Howes described this species as follows:

19mm. (⅔ in.). Palpi long, with dense long hairs. Antennae simple in both sexes. Forewings light ochre, marked with dark brown and golden orange. Dark-brown area at base, followed by a thin ochre line. A small golden patch continuing in dark brown to dorsum. A thin ochre line at ⅓, followed by a wider dark-brown area. An equally wide ochre line at ½ followed by a broad dark-brown area, which is interrupted at middle by a golden triangle. A thin ochre line follows, edged terminally with golden, which is indented on terminal side, where the veins cross. A dark-brown area to termen, with a faint subterminal line in ochre. The veins crossing this area marked in golden. Cilia dark ochre, barred with brown.

== Distribution ==
This species is endemic to New Zealand and has been observed in the southern parts of the South Island.

== Habitat and hosts ==
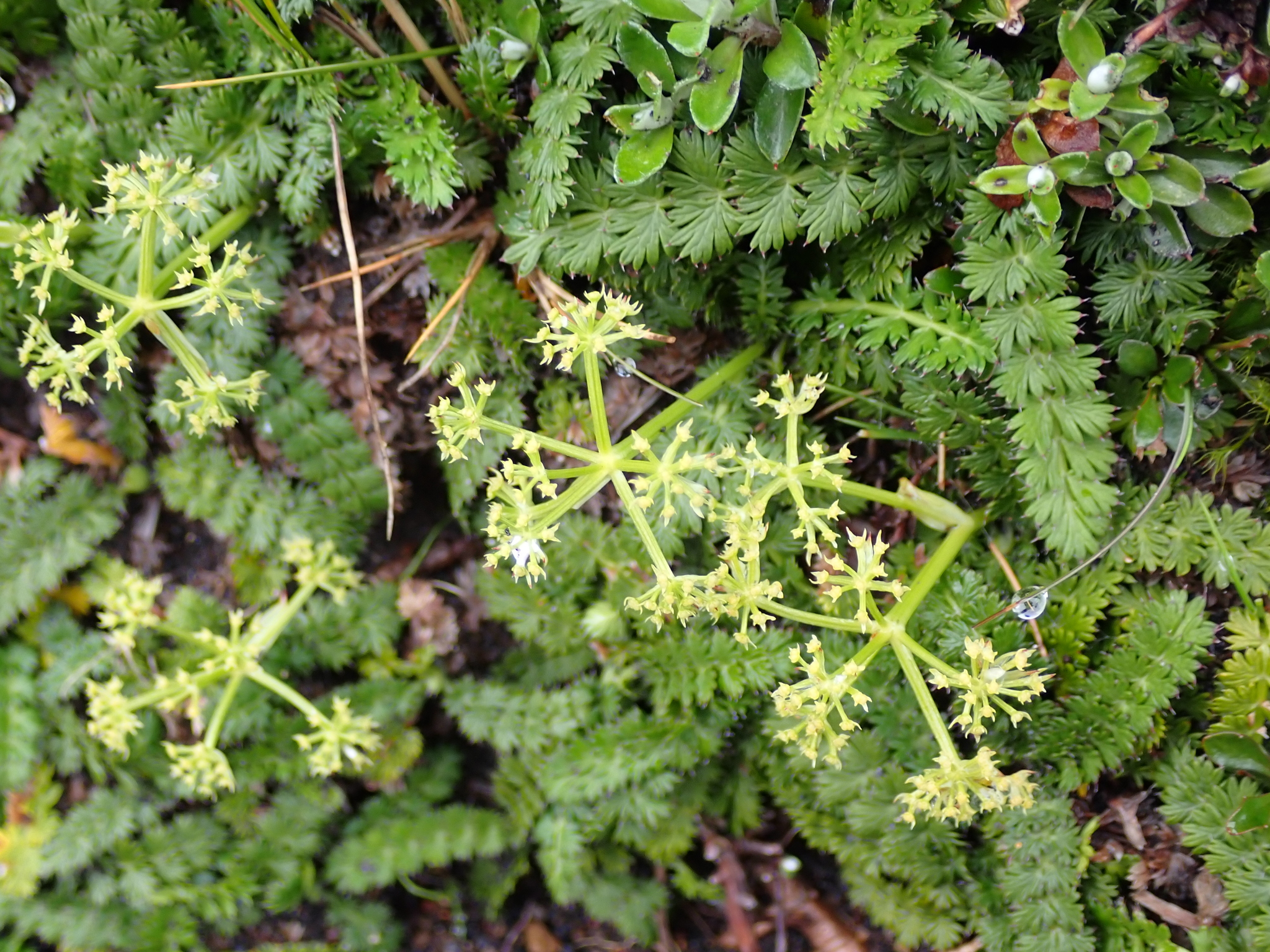
Larval host plant A. aromatica.

This species lives in montane grassland habitat. The larval host plant of this species is Anisotome aromatica.

== Behaviour ==
Adults are day flying and are on the wing from November until January.
