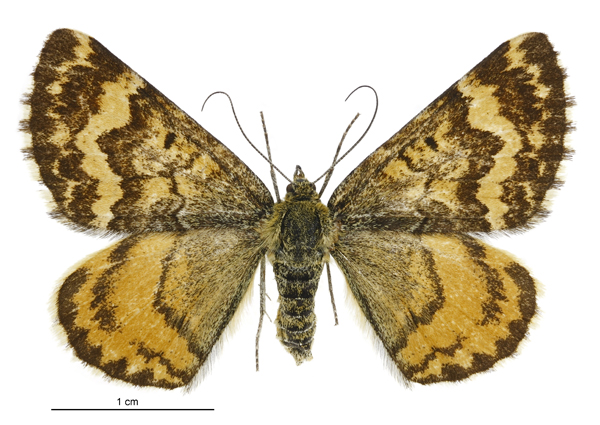
- Female Dasyuris partheniata

Scientific classification
- Kingdom: Animalia
- Phylum: Arthropoda
- Clade: Pancrustacea
- Class: Insecta
- Order: Lepidoptera
- Family: Geometridae
- Subfamily: Larentiinae
- Tribe: Xanthorhoini
- Genus: Dasyuris; Guenée, 1868

Synonyms
- Stathmonyma Meyrick, 1885; Statira Meyrick, 1883

= Dasyuris =

Genus of moths

Dasyuris is a genus of moths in the family Geometridae first described by Achille Guenée in 1868. The type species of this genus is Dasyuris partheniata by original designation. It has been stated that this genus is in need of revision.

== Description ==
Guenée originally described this genus as follows:

Antennae of the ♂ simple, granulated, scarcely pubescent. Palpi moderately long, connivent in form of a beak, hairy, the joints distinct. Haustellum robust. Body thick, velvety. Thorax robust, broad, hairy ; abdomen scaly, banded, laterally velvety, truncated at the apex. Legs long, scaly, spurs robust ; tarsi spiny. Wings stout, entire, with long fringes, the markings similar on both pairs, colours bright, even on the under-side.

== Species ==
Species within this genus are as follows:

- Dasyuris anceps (Butler, 1877)
  - Dasyuris anceps grisescens Dugdale, 1988
- Dasyuris austrina Philpott, 1928
- Dasyuris callicrena (Meyrick, 1883)
- Dasyuris catadees Prout, 1939
- Dasyuris enysii (Butler, 1877)
- Dasyuris fulminea Philpott, 1915
- Dasyuris hectori (Butler, 1877)
- Dasyuris leucobathra Meyrick, 1910
- Dasyuris micropolis Meyrick, 1929
- Dasyuris octans Hudson, 1923
- Dasyuris partheniata Guenée, 1868
- Dasyuris pluviata Hudson, 1928
- Dasyuris strategica (Meyrick, 1883)
- Dasyuris transaurea Howes, 1912
