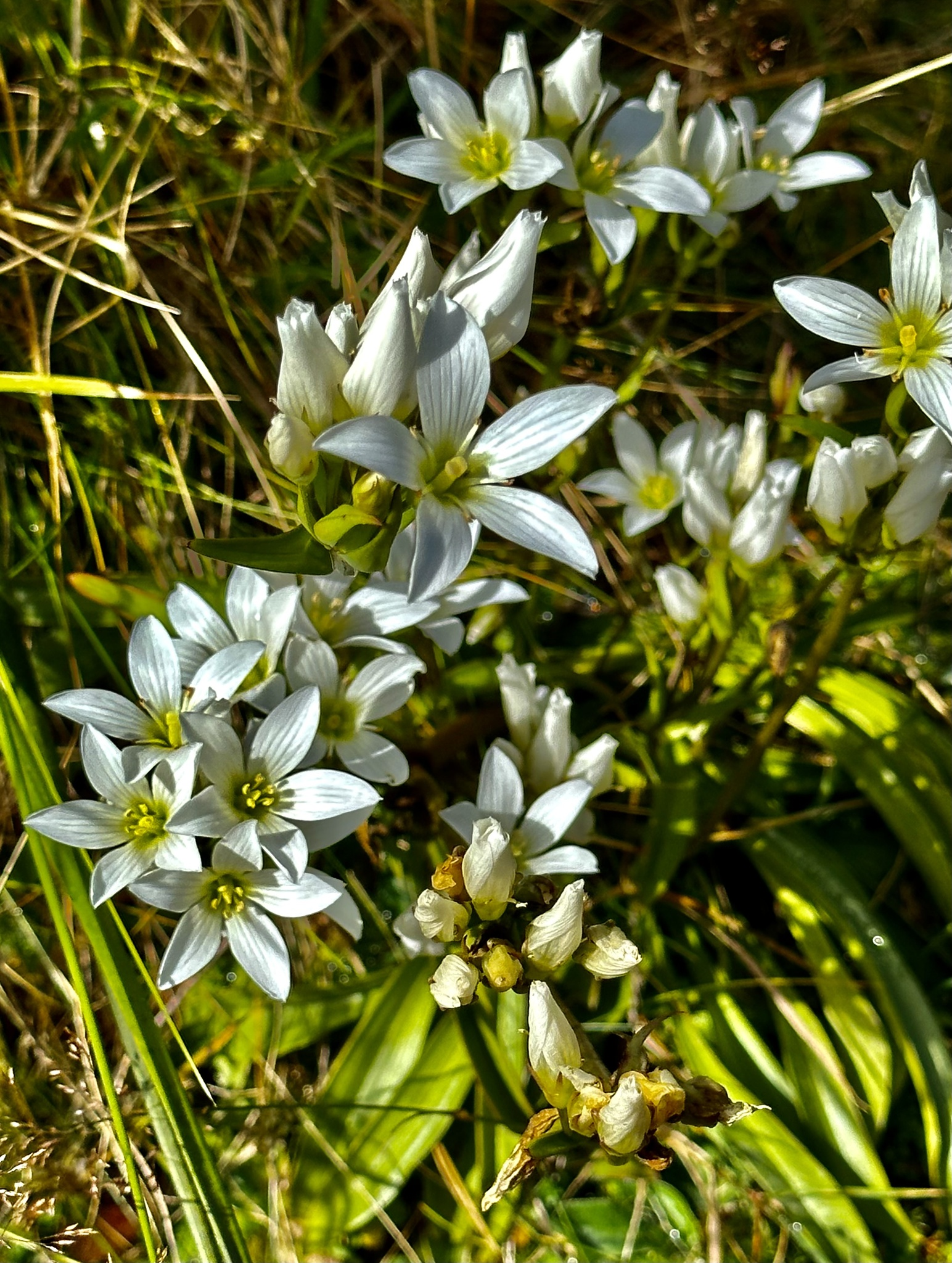
- Gentianella corymbifera in Kaikōura

Conservation status
- Not Threatened (NZ TCS)

Scientific classification
- Kingdom: Plantae
- Clade: Tracheophytes
- Clade: Angiosperms
- Clade: Eudicots
- Clade: Asterids
- Order: Gentianales
- Family: Gentianaceae
- Genus: Gentianella
- Species: G. corymbifera

Binomial name
- Gentianella corymbifera (Kirk) Holub

= Gentianella corymbifera =

Species of flowering plant

Gentianella corymbifera, commonly known as grassland or tall gentian, is a species of flowering plant, endemic to New Zealand.

== Description ==
A small herb, biennial, with bunches of white or pink flowers. The flowers appear from December to March.

This species can be distinguished from other species in the same genus by the short terminal stem of the flowers, by the many flowers (in some counts, up to 110), and by the rosette leaves, which are usually both wide, thick, and shaped like a V.

== Range ==
This species is found on the South Island of New Zealand, where it is generally found in the northern areas and to the east of the central spine of the mountains. It is rarer in Otago to the south.

== Habitat ==
This species lives in montane to alpine environments, from tussock grassland to fluvial washes.

== Ecology ==
The flowers are generally inedible to livestock. The leaves are however eaten by native grasshoppers. The flowers are visited by solitary bees, as well, such as Hylaeus matamoko, as well as flies and butterflies.

== Etymology ==
Corymb is a botanical term, where the stalks of lower flowers are extended to the same length as the upper flowers, resulting in a bouquet-like appearance for the flowers. Corymbifera is a neo-Latin construction which means 'corymb-bearing'.

== Taxonomy ==
Gentianella corymbifera contains the following subspecies:

- Gentianella corymbifera subsp. corymbifera
- Gentianella corymbifera subsp. gracilis

Neither subspecies is threatened.

== Chemistry ==
A naturally occurring penta-oxygenated xanthone pigment, called corymbiferin, with the molecular formula C15H12O7 [1,3,8-trihydroxy-4,5-dimethoxy-9H-xanthen-9-one] has been isolated from the roots. The flowers only have six volatile compounds.
