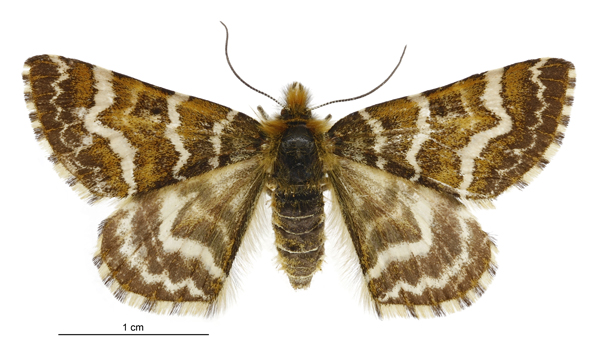
- Female
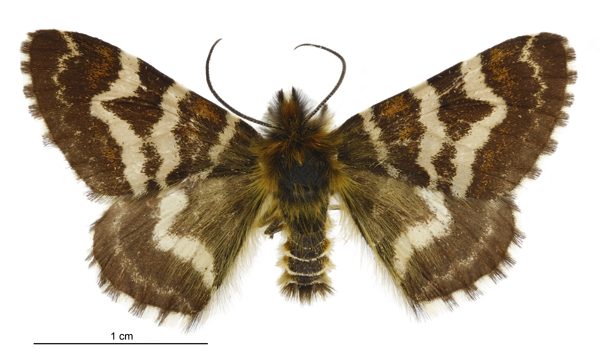
- Male

Scientific classification
- Kingdom: Animalia
- Phylum: Arthropoda
- Clade: Pancrustacea
- Class: Insecta
- Order: Lepidoptera
- Family: Geometridae
- Genus: Dasyuris
- Species: D. callicrena

Binomial name
- Dasyuris callicrena (Meyrick, 1883)

Synonyms
- Pasithea callicrena Meyrick, 1883; Notoreas callicrena (Meyrick, 1883)

= Dasyuris callicrena =

Species of moth endemic to New Zealand

Dasyuris callicrena is a species of moth in the family Geometridae. This species was first described by Edward Meyrick in 1883. It is endemic to New Zealand and is found in the South Island. This species inhabits open grassy slopes in the subalpine or alpine zones. Adults are on wing from November until February and are day flying. Larvae feed on Veronica odora.

== Taxonomy ==
This species was first described by Edward Meyrick in 1883 and originally named Pasithea callicrena. In 1884 Meyrick gave a fuller description of this species. George Hudson first discussed and illustrated this species under the name Notoreas callicrena in 1898 in his book New Zealand moths and butterflies (Macro-lepidoptera). He subsequently discussed and illustrated this species under the name Dasyuris callicrena in his 1928 book The butterflies and moths of New Zealand. The female holotype, collected at Kinloch in the Otago by R. W. Fereday, is held at the Canterbury Museum.

== Description ==
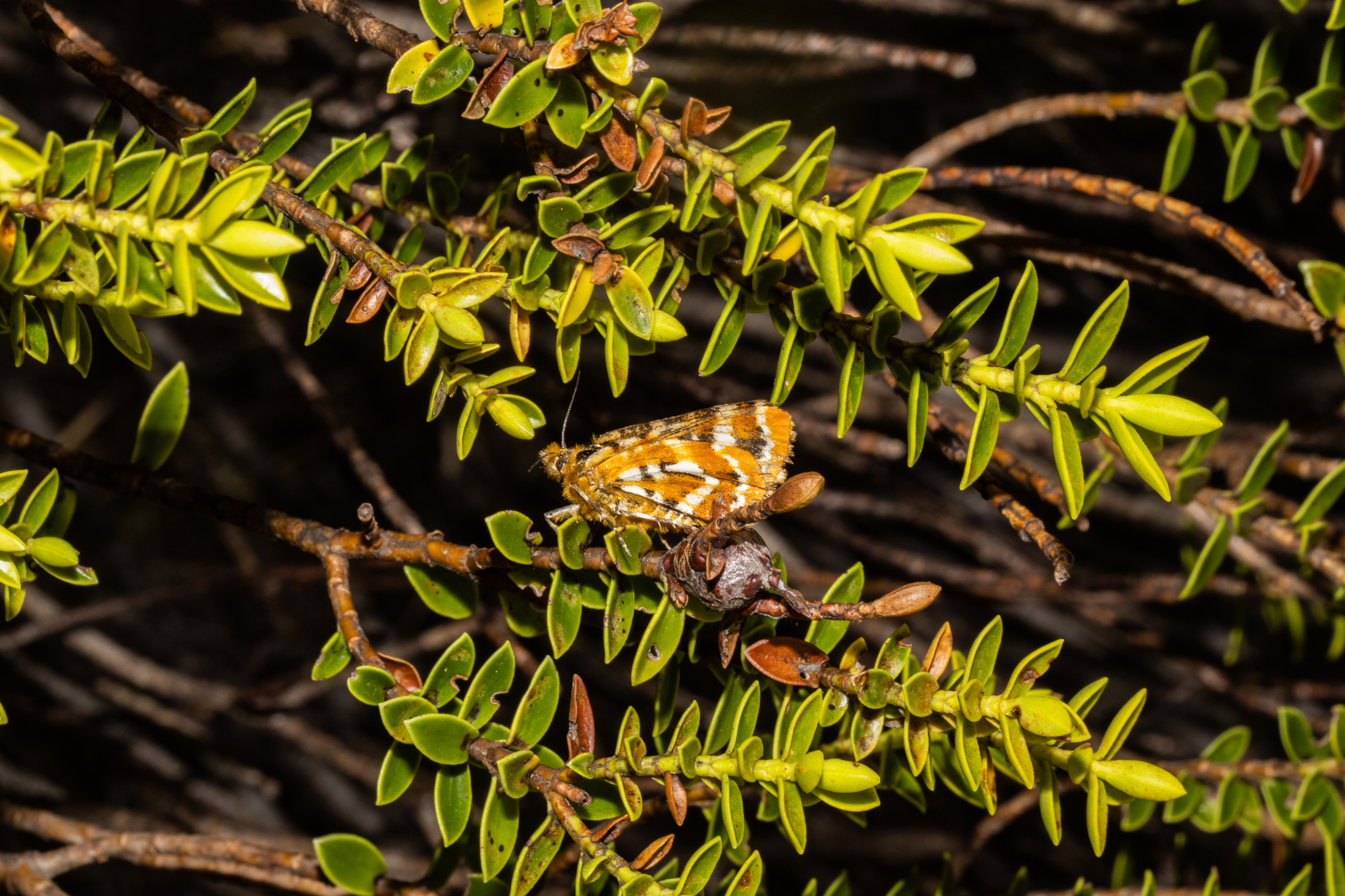
Female on the larval host plant.

The wingspan of this species ranges between 32 and 36 mm. Meyrick described this species as follows:

Female.—34 mm. Forewings moderate, hindmargin rounded ; blackish, irregularly suffused with light reddish; markings ochreous-whitish, dark-margined ; a slender somewhat sinuate oblique fascia towards base; a moderate twice sinuate fascia before middle ; a moderately broad subdentate fascia beyond middle, sinuate above middle; a sharply dentate subterminal line: cilia reddish-whitish, barred with dark fuscous. Hindwings moderate, hindmargin rounded; dark grey; a very obscure whitish line before middle; a moderate whitish fascia beyond middle, sinuate-curved in middle; subterminal line and cilia as in forewings; beneath ground-colour reddish.

== Distribution ==
D. callicrena is endemic to New Zealand and is found throughout the South Island. However occurrences of this species are regarded as being scattered and most commonly occurring in the mountains of Otago and Fiordland.

== Habitat and hosts ==
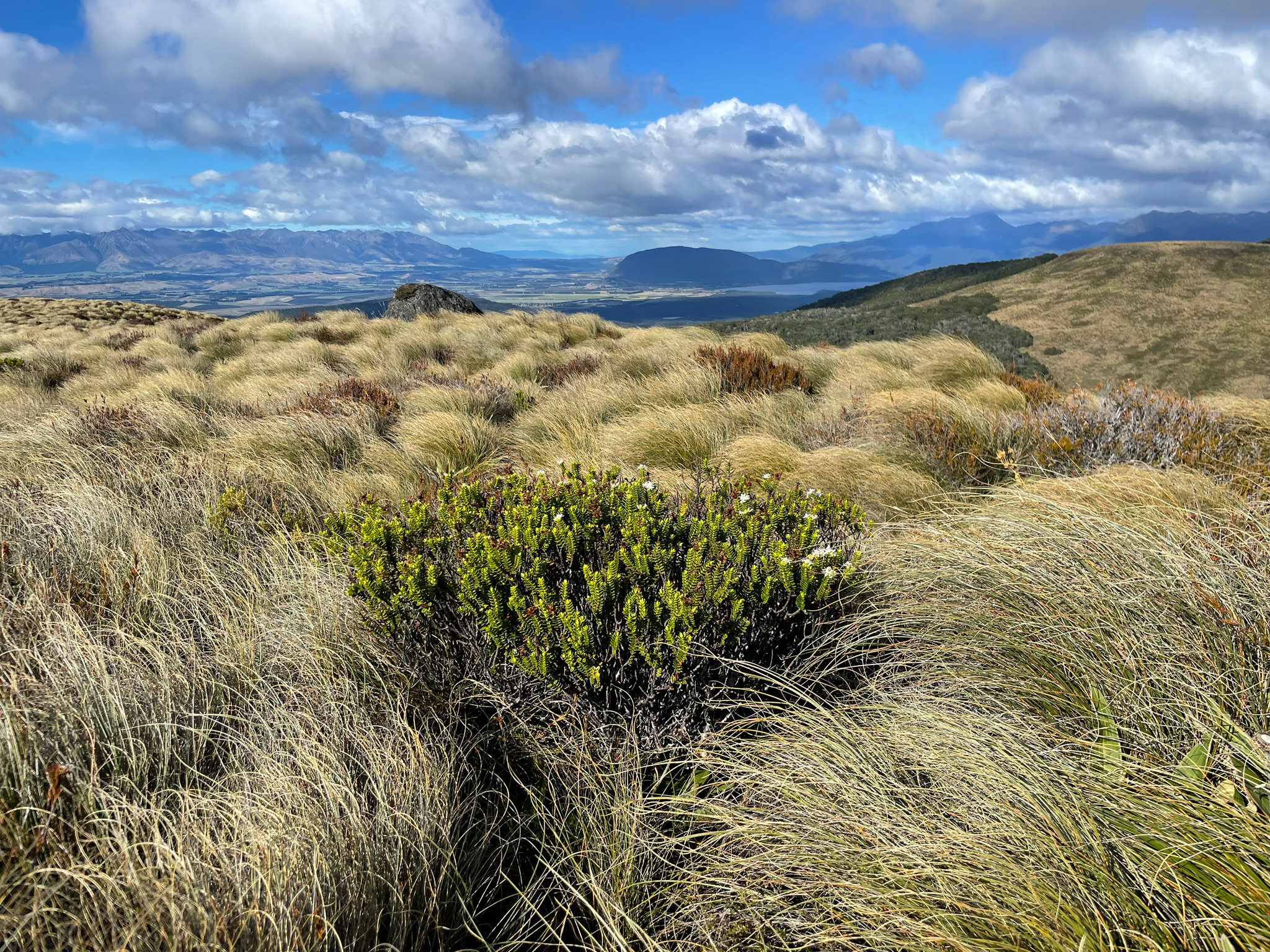
Larval host V. odora.

The preferred habitat of this species is open grassy slopes in the subalpine or alpine zones. The larval host plant is Veronica odora.

== Behaviour ==
Adults are on the wing commonly from November to February. Adults are day flying and are rapid fliers in hot sunshine.
