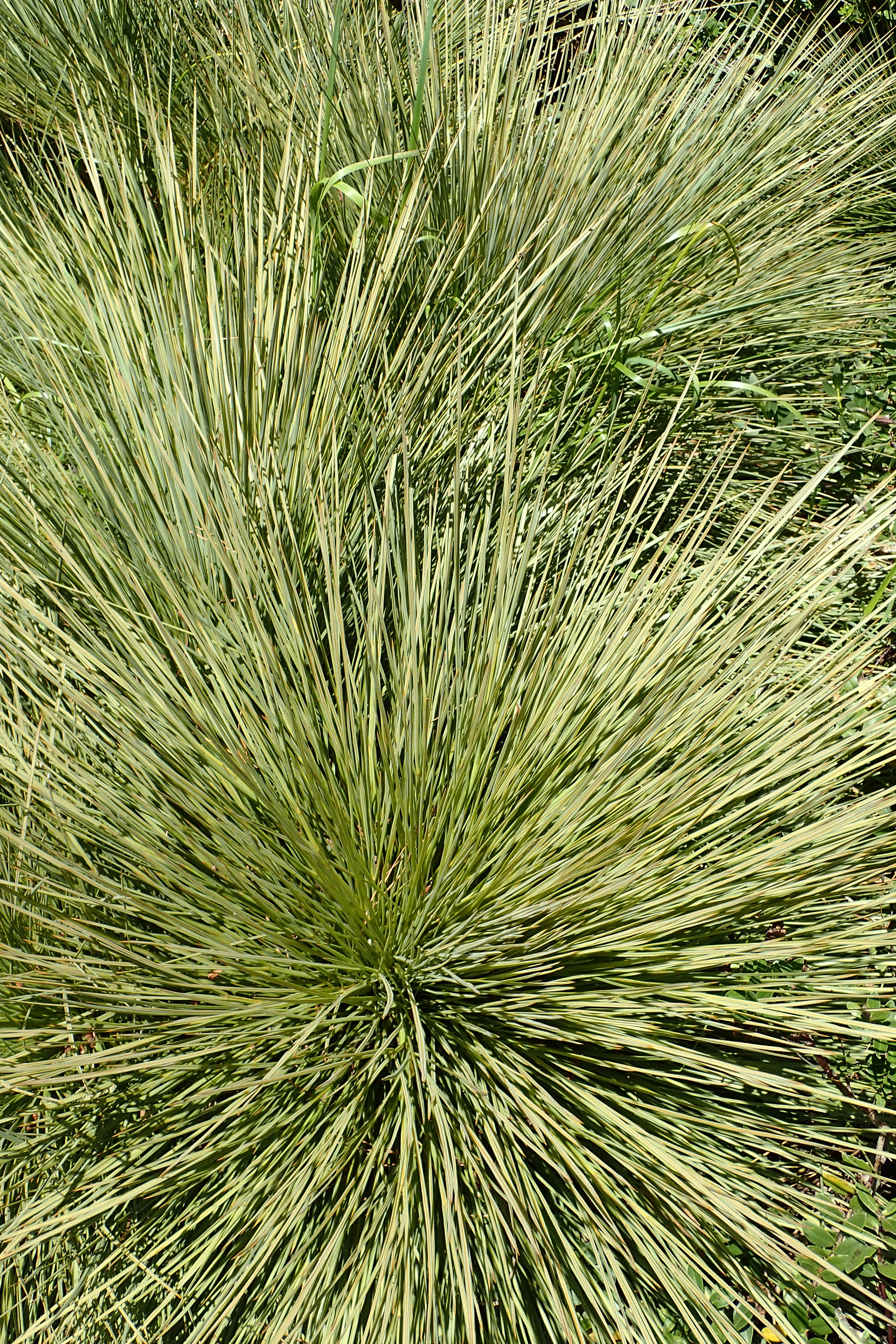
- Aciphylla subflabellata in Dunedin Botanic Garden

Conservation status
- Declining (NZ TCS)

Scientific classification
- Kingdom: Plantae
- Clade: Tracheophytes
- Clade: Angiosperms
- Clade: Eudicots
- Clade: Asterids
- Order: Apiales
- Family: Apiaceae
- Genus: Aciphylla
- Species: A. subflabellata

Binomial name
- Aciphylla subflabellata W.R.B.Oliv.

= Aciphylla subflabellata =

Species of flowering plant

Aciphylla subflabellata is one of the 40 species of the genus Aciphylla, all found only in New Zealand and Australia.

== Description ==
A. subflabellata is one of the larger species in the genus Aciphylla, and it contains clear exudate. This species is a perennial herb that forms stout rosettes of spiky leaves reaching 50—80 cm. The leaves are distinctive for being fan-like and flattened: the leaf pinnae are set close together, and are roughly in the same plane as the leaf axis. It is a "spear grass" with stems that can grow to 80 cm, producing a dense rosette at the top. These stems are arranged in a subfellate to pinnate shape and tend to be a yellow - green colour. The stems are 25 mm in diameter with a 2 cm sheath that parts into 2–4 ligules. Each ligule then contains leaflets that can grow to 25 cm long and 3 mm thick. The overall plant can grow to 1 metre in height. The flowering stem is up to 1 m tall and 25 mm wide, with a 50–60 cm inflorescence. The yellow flowers appear from December to February, and the wind-dispersed seeds in February to May.

In his description Oliver noted that this species was most similar to A. squarrosa in its narrow leaves and downturned terminal bract segments, but the finely-toothed terminal bracts are much longer (up to 30 cm) and the leaves are always bipinnate. A. subflabellata has more finely-divided and flattened leaves than A. squarrosa, and is usually much smaller.

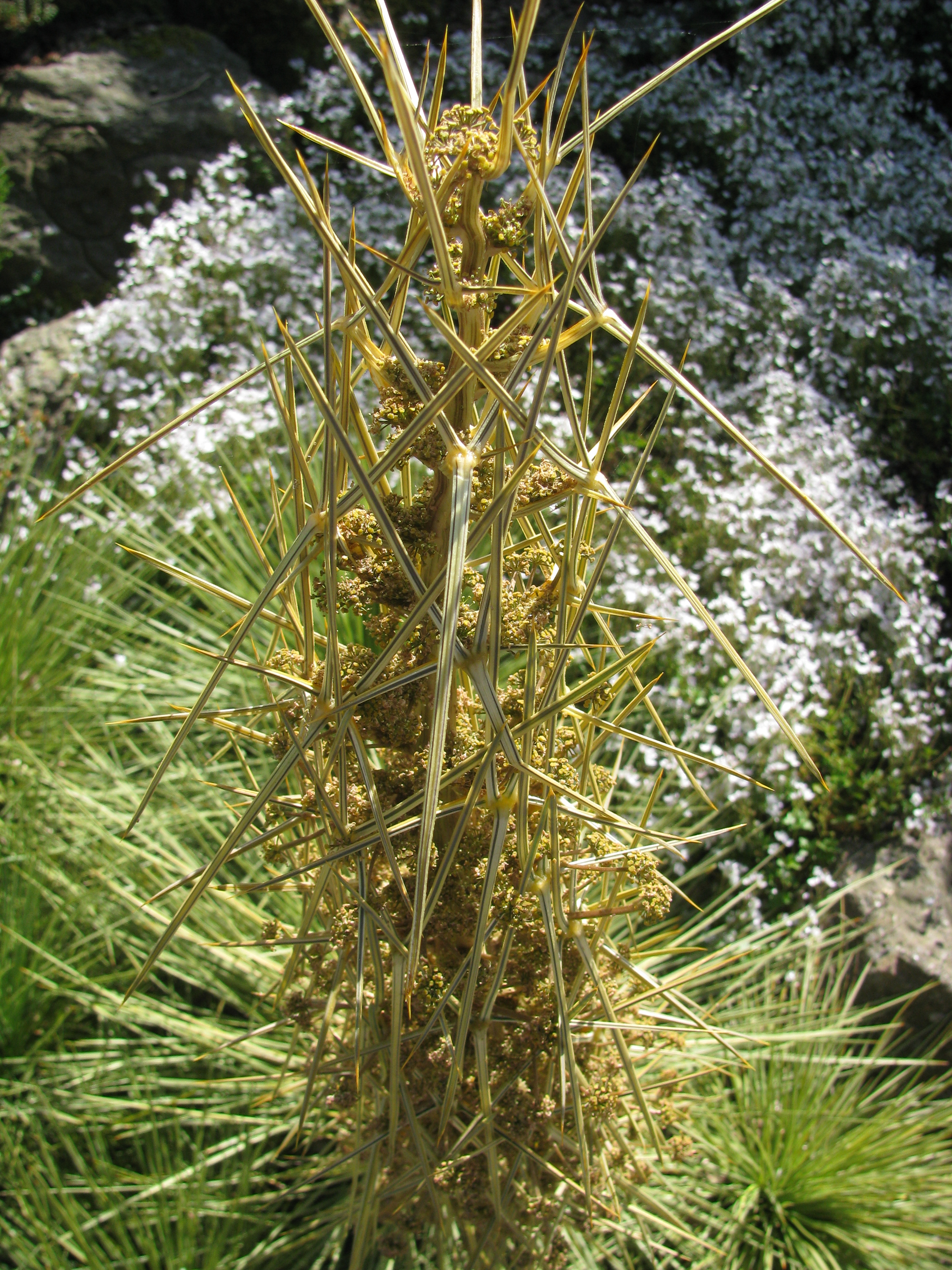
Inflorescence

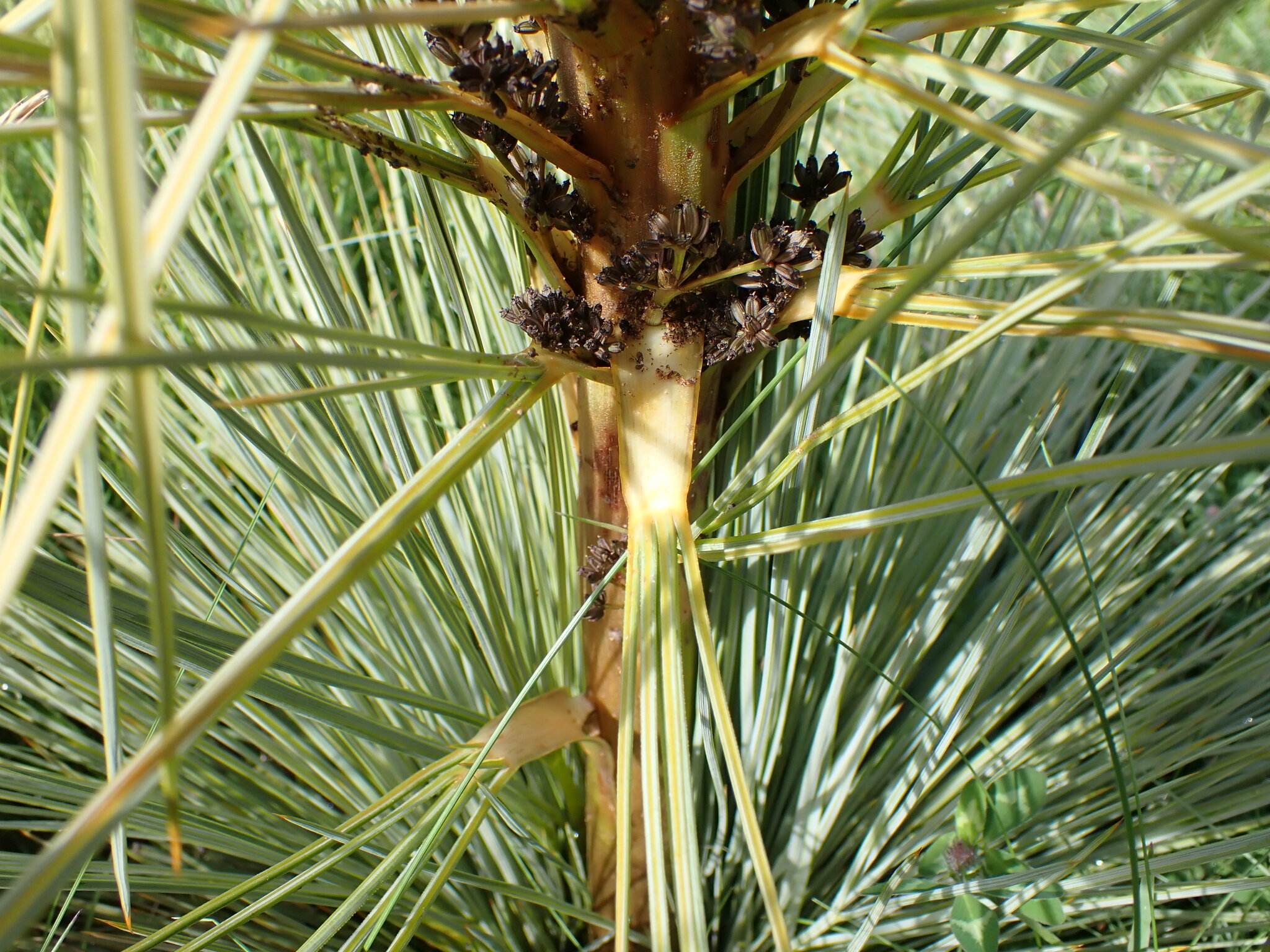
Flowers

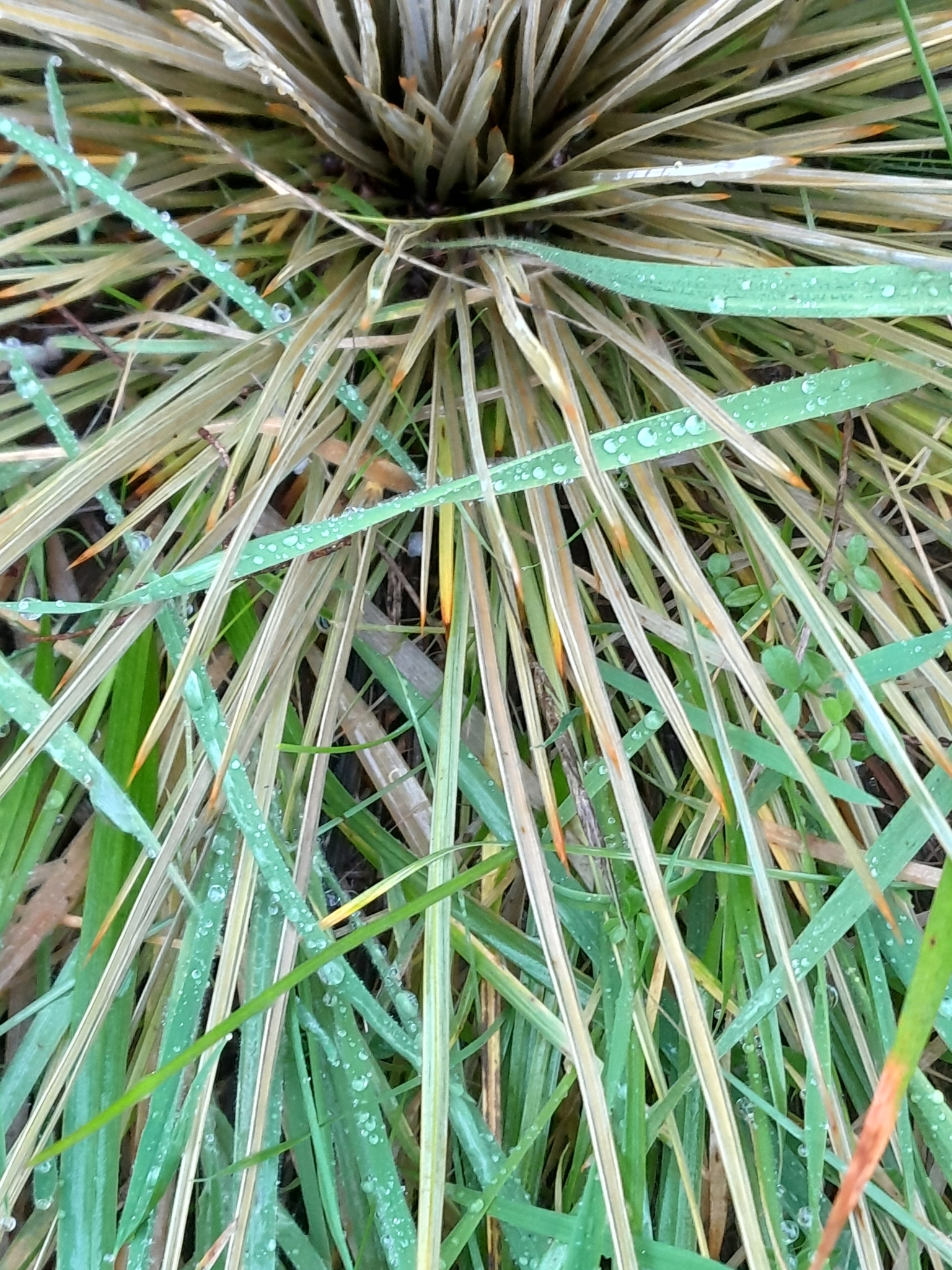
Leaves

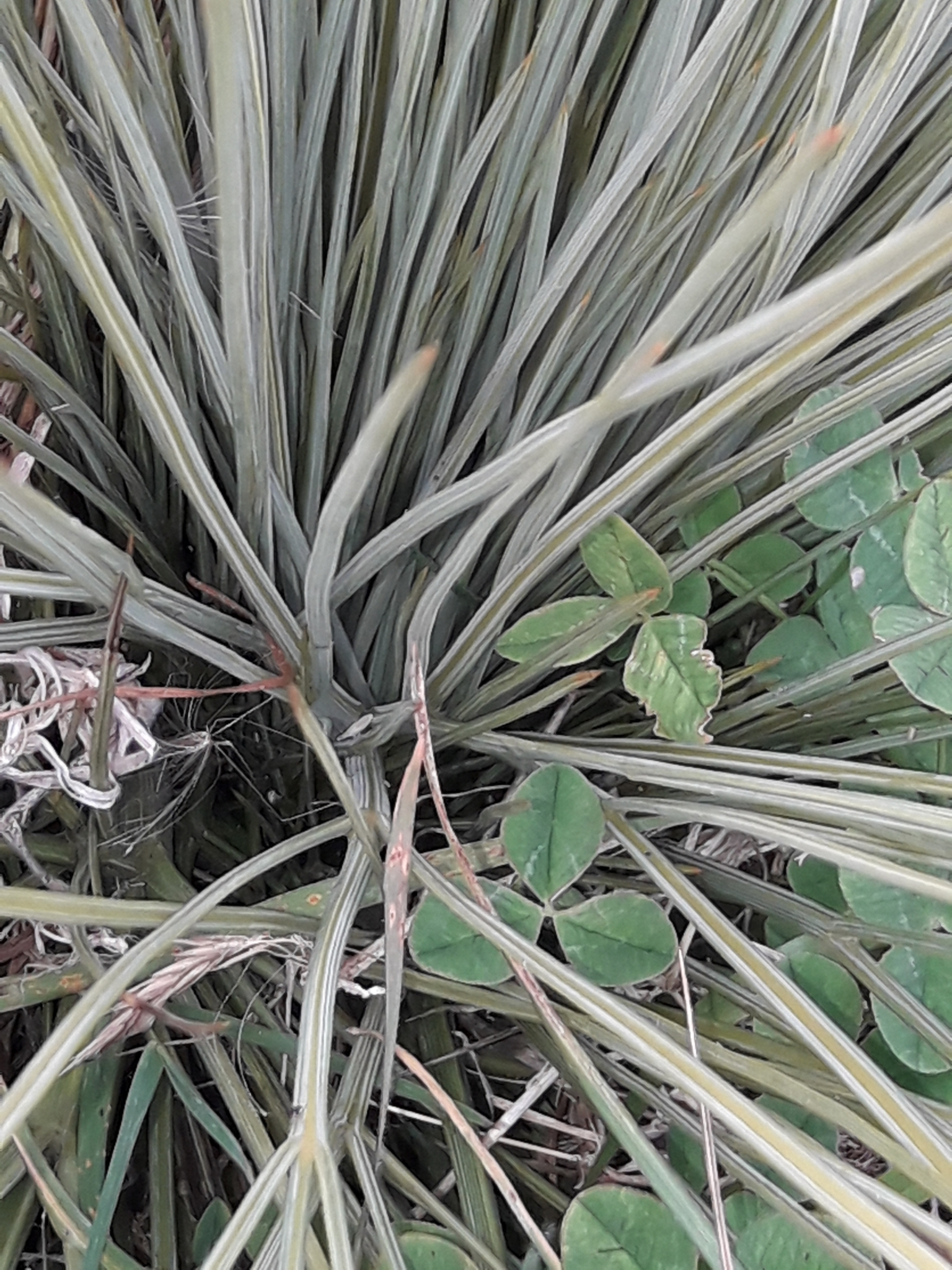
Pinnae

== Taxonomy and naming ==
Walter Oliver first described the plant in 1956, from a type specimen collected Waiau tussock grassland. Its specific epithet means "somewhat fan-like".

== Distribution ==
A. subflabellata is endemic to New Zealand and only found on the eastern side of the South Island, from south-eastern Marlborough to Southland and from 300–1,400 metres (980–4,590 ft). It prefers dry subalpine sites, and is sometimes found amongst rocks.

There are a few areas within Canterbury where speargrass is found, including Banks Peninsula. A. subflabellata has been grown by people from seed and planted on Banks Peninsula to help restore it.

== Habitat ==
Spear grass is usually found in dry climates amongst tussock grasses and rock. Spear grass is well suited to alluvial terraces, basins, or rolling hills, and does not like humid climates or being wet.

== Ecology ==
=== Life cycle and phenology ===
A. subflabellata produces flowers during the summer months of December–February. These yellow flowers are then pollinated by insects during a synchronised pollination period. A. subflabellata is a dioecious plant, so there are both male and female plants. Between February and May, after pollination, fruit is produced. When these fruits are dried, they crack and fall apart. The seeds are then dispersed by the wind. Speargrass is easy to grow and grows relatively quickly. Once A. subflabellata has been planted, it is best not to replant or disturb the roots.

=== Predators, parasites and diseases ===
One of the threats to A. subflabellata is browsing by introduced animals. Many grazing animals, such as rabbits and livestock, eat spear grass. Rabbits can also dig up smaller speargrasses and kill the whole plant. Another threat is the weeds overtaking the habitat.

Insects such as the endangered Canterbury knobbled weevil also feed on speargrass. The adult weevils eat the leaves, and the larvae feed on the roots.

== Conservation ==
This species' status under the Department of Conservation's NZTCS system is "At Risk – Declining". It may be naturally uncommon over most of its range, but much of its habitat has been modified for pastoral farming and like most Aciphylla species it is vulnerable to browsing by stock, rabbits, and hares.

== Cultural uses ==
Māori use species in Aciphylla to make perfumes. Māori collected the resin from the two species that they were able to identify; small and large taramea. Typically, only the larger Taramea would be used to make perfume. The resin collected could also be used as a medical remedy. Taramea is now classified as taonga under the 1998 Ngāi Tahu Treaty of Waitangi.
