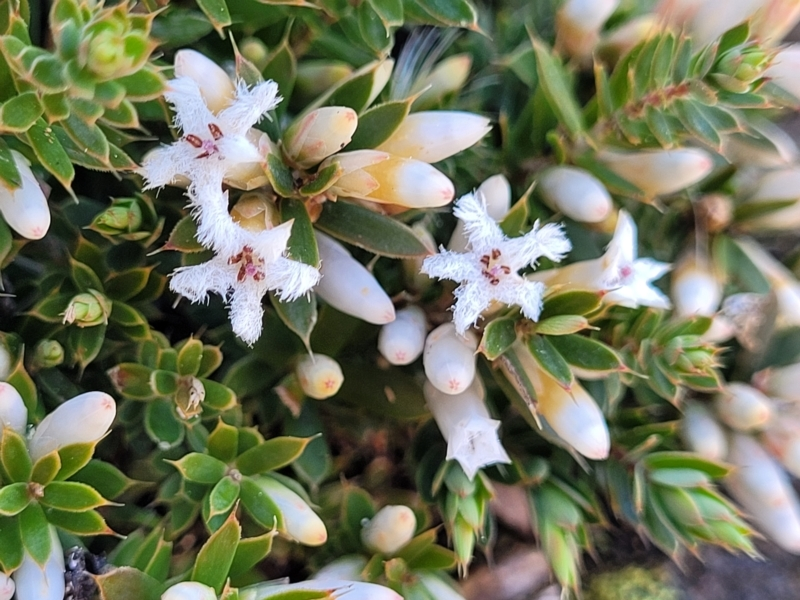
- Near Adaminaby

Scientific classification
- Kingdom: Plantae
- Clade: Tracheophytes
- Clade: Angiosperms
- Clade: Eudicots
- Clade: Asterids
- Order: Ericales
- Family: Ericaceae
- Genus: Styphelia
- Species: S. nesophila

Binomial name
- Styphelia nesophila (DC.) Sleumer
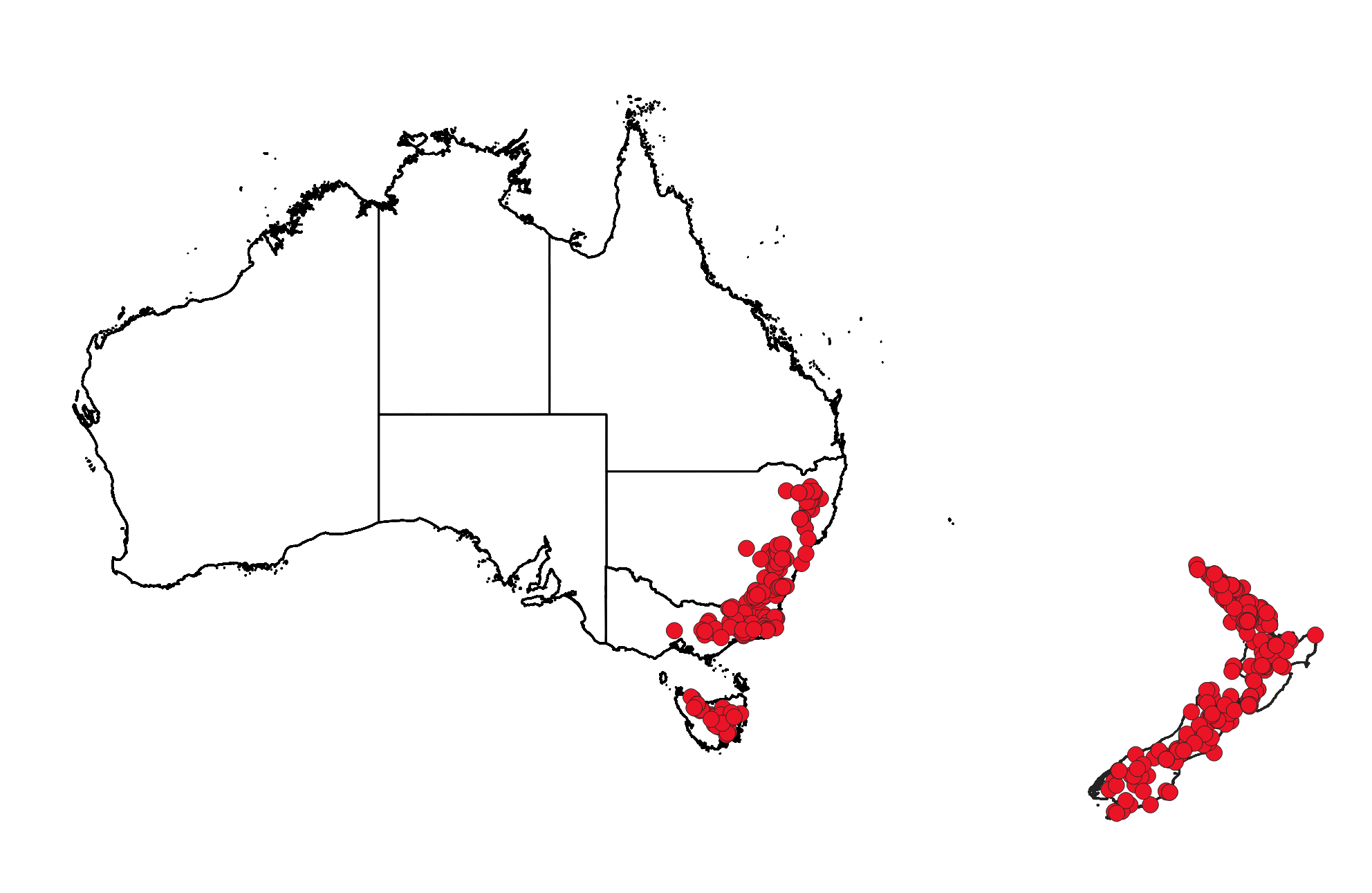
- Occurrence data from AVH

Synonyms
- Leucopogon nesophilus DC.; Cyathodes fraseri (A.Cunn.) Allan; Cyathodes fraseri var. muscosa (G.Simpson) Allan; Leucopogon bellignianus n.; Leucopogon fraseri var. muscosus G.Simpson; Leucopogon stuartii F.Muell. ex Sond.; Pentachondra mucronata Hook.f.; Styphelia fraseri (A.Cunn.) F.Muell. nom. illeg.; Styphelia mucronata (Hook.f.) J.H.Willis

= Styphelia nesophila =

Species of flowering plant

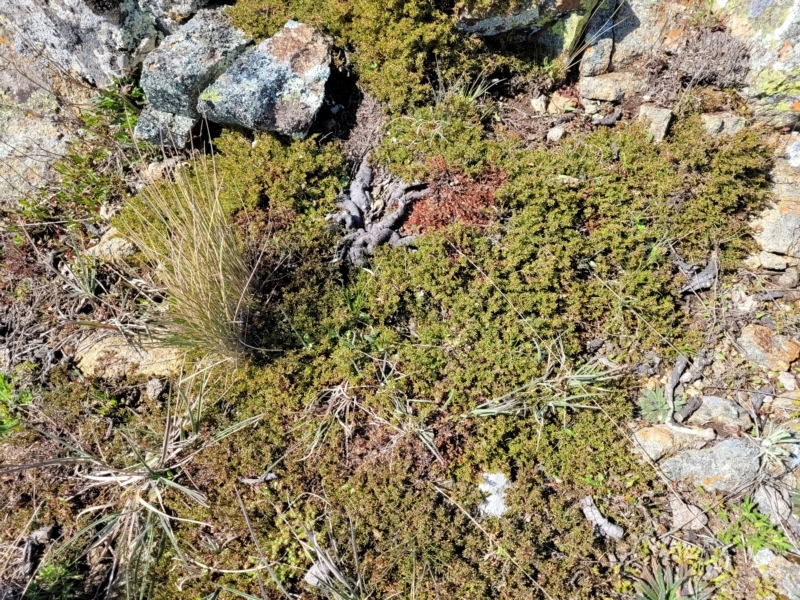
Habit

Styphelia nesophila, commonly known as sharp beard-heath, is a species of flowering plant in the heath family Ericaceae and is native to south-eastern Australia and New Zealand, where it is known as pātōtara, or dwarf mingimingi. It is a prickly, prostrate to trailing or low-growing shrub with egg-shaped leaves, and erect, tube-shaped white flowers usually arranged singly in leaf axils.

== Description ==
Styphelia nesophila is a prickly, prostrate to trailing, low-growing shrub that typically grows to a height of up to 30 cm (12 in) and has bristly branchlets. Its leaves are egg-shaped to lance-shaped with the narrower end towards the base, 3–8 mm (0.12–0.31 in) long and 1–2.5 mm (0.039–0.098 in) wide. The leaves are glabrous, pale-edged, and have a thin, sharp point up to 1.5 mm (0.059 in) long on the tip. The flowers are usually arranged singly in leaf axils on a peduncle about 1 mm (0.039 in) long, with bracteoles 1.1–1.8 mm (0.043–0.071 in) long at the base. The sepals are 2.5–3.9 mm (0.098–0.154 in) long, the petals forming a tube 4–5 mm (0.16–0.20 in) long and hairy inside, the petal lobes 2.0–3.4 mm (0.079–0.134 in) long. Flowering occurs from August to October and the fruit is a glabrous, yellow, egg-shaped to elliptic drupe 4.7–5.3 mm (0.19–0.21 in) long.

== Taxonomy ==
This species was first formally described in 1839 by Augustin Pyramus de Candolle in his Prodromus Systematis Naturalis Regni Vegetabilis from specimens collected in New Zealand. In 1963, Hermann Otto Sleumer transferred the species to the genus Styphelia as S. nesophila in the journal Blumea.

== Distribution and habitat ==
This styphelia grows in forest, shrubland and heath, often in poorly-drained or sandy soils or among rocks, and usually occurs at an altitude of above about 500 m (1,600 ft). It is found on the tablelands of northern and southern New South Wales, in eastern Victoria, on the Central Plateau of Tasmania, and in New Zealand.

== Conservation status ==
Styphelia nesophila is listed as "not threatened" in New Zealand.

== Ecology ==
The fleshy fruits are dispersed by frugivory.
