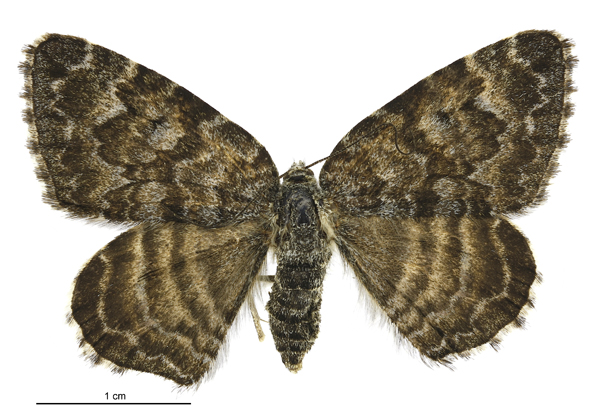
- Female
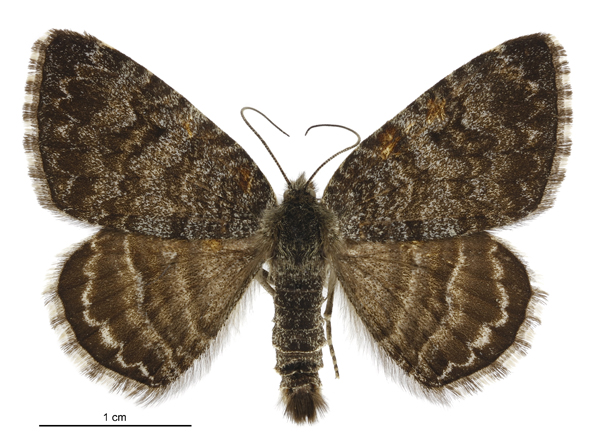
- Male

Scientific classification
- Kingdom: Animalia
- Phylum: Arthropoda
- Clade: Pancrustacea
- Class: Insecta
- Order: Lepidoptera
- Family: Geometridae
- Genus: Dasyuris
- Species: D. hectori

Binomial name
- Dasyuris hectori (Butler, 1877)

Synonyms
- Euclidia hectori Butler, 1877; Statira hectori (Butler, 1877); Stathmonyma hectori (Butler1877)

= Dasyuris hectori =

Species of moth endemic to New Zealand

Dasyuris hectori is a species of moth in the family Geometridae. This species was first described by Arthur Gardiner Butler in 1877. It is endemic to New Zealand and is found in the South Island. This species inhabits herb fields and rocky terrain in subalpine and alpine zones. Adults are day flying and are on the wing from December until February. Larvae feed on species in the genus Anisotome.

== Taxonomy ==
This species was first described by Arthur Gardiner Butler in 1877 and originally named Euclidia hectori. In 1883 Edward Meyrick placed this species in the genus Statira. However, as this name was preoccupied, Meyrick then placed this species in the genus Stathmonyma. In 1898 George Hudson synonymised that name and placed this species in the genus Dasyuris. In that publication, New Zealand moths and butterflies (Macro-lepidoptera), Hudson redescribed and illustrated D. hectori. Using that same name, in 1928 Hudson again went on to describe and illustrate this species in his book The butterflies and moths of New Zealand. The female holotype, collected by James Hector or John Davies Enys in either at the Otago Lakes or mid Canterbury, is held at the Natural History Museum, London.

== Description ==
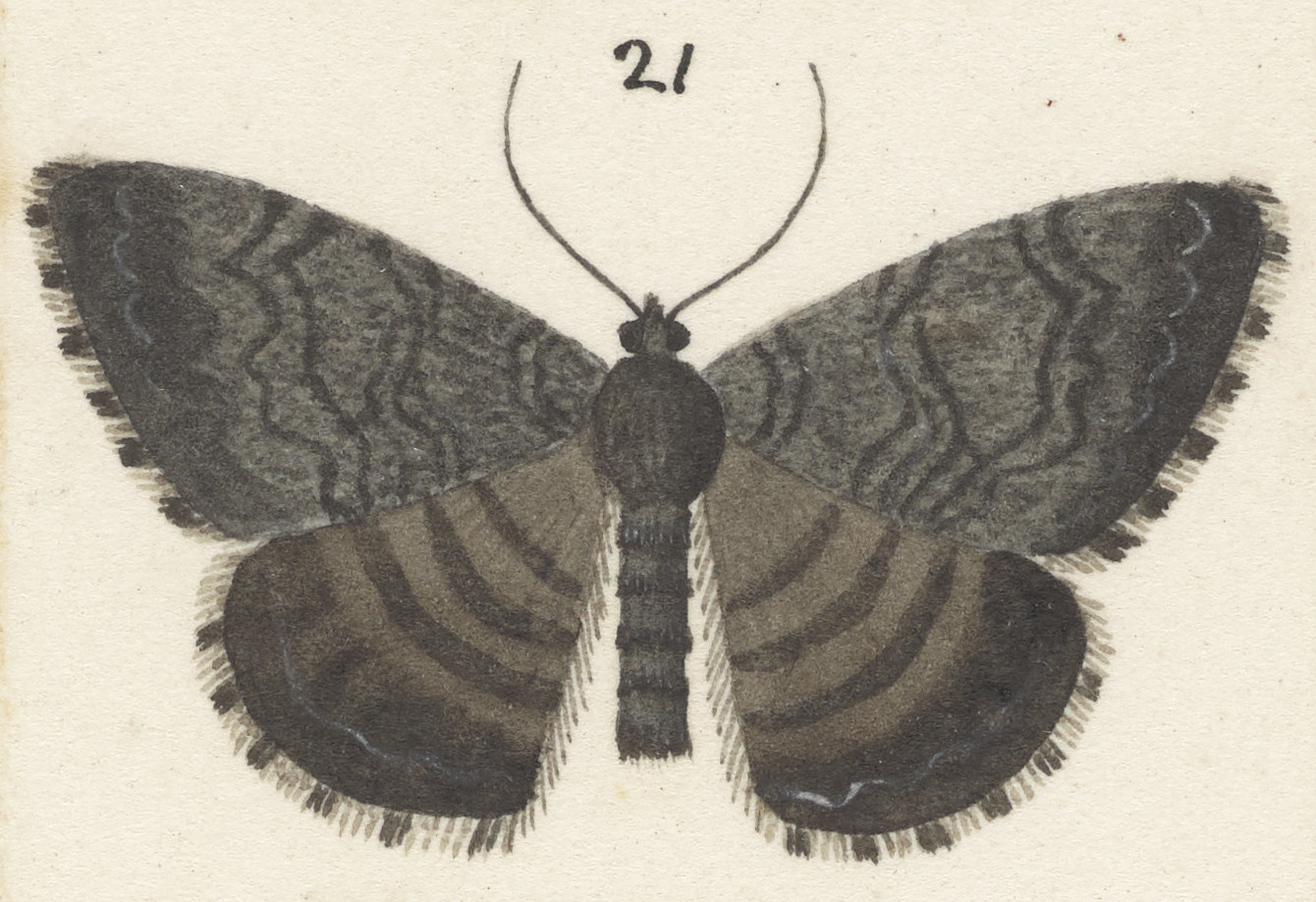
Illustration of male by Hudson

Hudson described this species as follows:

The expansion of the wings is 1 1/2 inches. All the wings are dark greyish-black, speckled with bluish-grey scales. The fore-wings have live rather indistinct wavy darker transverse lines, and a very broad darker shading near the termen ; there is a fine white mark near the apex, continued as an indistinct wavy line towards the tornus. The hind-wings have three or four indistinct darker transverse lines, and a very broad terminal shading; there are two, more or less distinct, line, wavy, white lines, the first a. little below the middle, and the second near the termen ; the cilia are dark grey barred with pale grey. On the under side all the wings are dark blackish-grey, traversed by six broad wavy whitish lines.

== Distribution ==
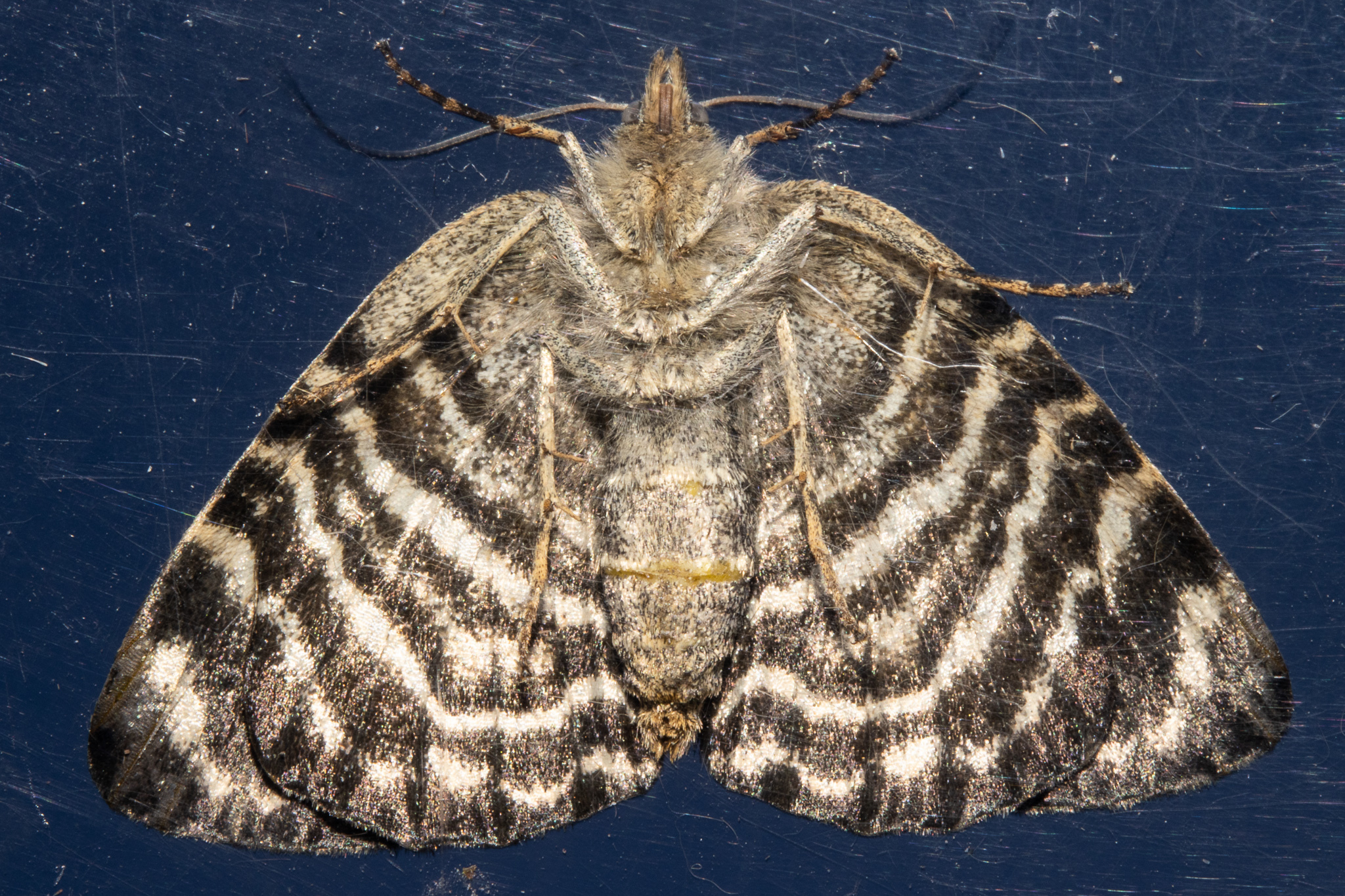
Underside of D. hectori.

This species is endemic to New Zealand and has been observed in the South Island.

== Habitat and hosts ==
This species frequents rocky terrain at subalpine and alpine zones at altitudes from 4,700 to 5,700 feet above the sea-level. It can also be found in alpine herb fields. Larvae feed on species in the genus Anisotome.

== Behaviour ==
Adults of this species are on the wing from December until February. It is a fast flier and adults have been observed resting on blackened rocks in hot sunshine.
