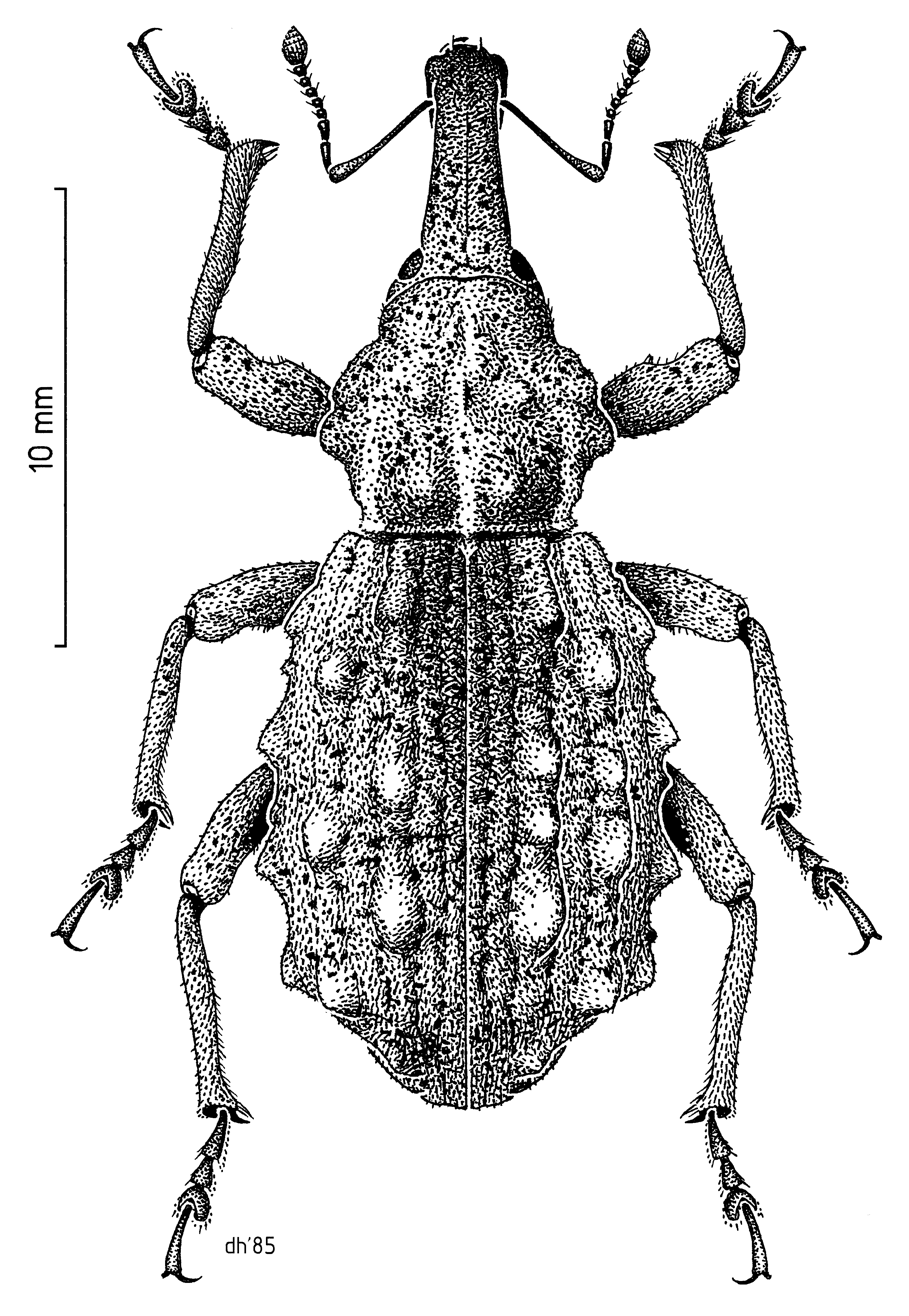

Conservation status
- Relict (NZ TCS)

Scientific classification
- Kingdom: Animalia
- Phylum: Arthropoda
- Class: Insecta
- Order: Coleoptera
- Suborder: Polyphaga
- Infraorder: Cucujiformia
- Family: Curculionidae
- Genus: Hadramphus
- Species: H. stilbocarpae

Binomial name
- Hadramphus stilbocarpae Kuschel, 1971

= Hadramphus stilbocarpae =

Species of weevil

Hadramphus stilbocarpae, commonly known as the knobbled weevil, is a species of weevil endemic to New Zealand. It was first described by Guillermo Kuschel in 1971. H. stilbocarpae occur on Snares Island, Stewart Island a few islands in Fiordland. As larvae, they feed on the rhizomes of plants such as those in the Azorella genus. Under the New Zealand Threat Classification System, this species is listed as "Relict" with the qualifiers of "Range Restricted". They are threatened by predation from introduced rats.

== Taxonomy ==
This species was first described in 1971 by Guillermo Kuschel from specimens collected on Snares Island and Stewart Island. The holotype is stored in the New Zealand Arthropod Collection under registration number NZAC04041541. It was most recently revised in 1999.

=== Phylogeny ===
- Lyperobius huttoni
- - Hadramphus pittospori
  - - Hadramphus spinipennis
    - - Hadramphus tuberculatus
      - Hadramphus stilbocarpae

Phylogeny of the Hadramphus genus.

A 2018 study examined the relationships of the four Hadramphus species. A phylogenetic tree was created using a combination of cytochrome oxidase I and internal transcribe spacer genes. The tree produced suggested that Hadramphus stilbocarpae is most closely related to Hadramphus tuberculatus which is known from the Canterbury region.

== Description ==
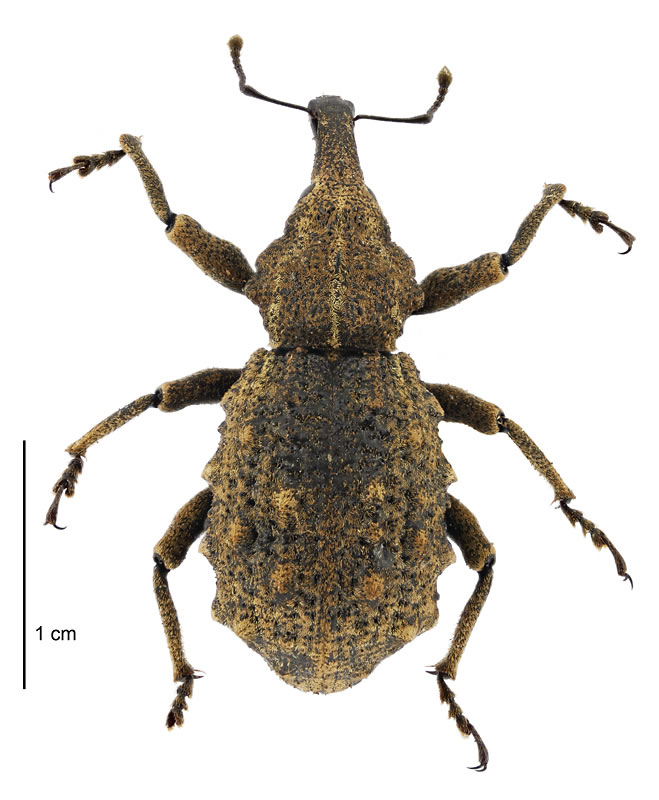

The adults of Hadramphus stilbocarpaeare 15.5-21.7mm in length. The body is dark brown and covered in dark brown to greyish brown scales. The upper surface of the pronotum has pale lines running down the middle and along the margins. The elytra has an oval shape with tubercules on the third, fourth, fifth and seventh intervals.

As larvae, H. stilbocarpae reach a maximum size of 17.5mm in length. The head is coloured blackish brown and has easily visible anterior ocelli (but the posterior ocelli are indistinct).

When they pupate, H. stilbocarpae can reach up to 17mm in length. They are quite similar to Lyperobius.

== Distribution and habitat ==
This species is endemic to New Zealand. They are only known from the subantarctic Snares Island, Stewart Island and Resolution island in the Fiordland region. In 1991, a population was translocated to Breaksea Island, also in Fiordland. They are known to occur in vegetation along the coast.

== Diet ==
The larvae of Hadramphus stilbocarpae feed on the rhizomes of plants. They have been recorded feeding on Anisotome lyallii, Azorella lyallii, and Azorella robusta. As adults, they are often observed feeding on leaves of plants.

== Conservation status ==
Under the New Zealand Threat Classification System, this species is currently listed as "Relict" with the qualifiers of "Range Restricted". Under the previous classification system, it was listed as "Ranged Restricted" with the qualifiers of "Extreme Fluctuations" and "Human Induced". Populations of H. stilbocarpae have seemingly declined due to predations by rats.
