= Breaksea =

Breaksea may refer to:

== Places ==
=== In Australia ===
- Breaksea Island (Western Australia), off the southwestern coast of the mainland
- Breaksea Islands (Tasmania), off the southwestern coast of Tasmania, Australia

=== In New Zealand ===
- Breaksea Island (Fiordland), in Fiordland National Park
- Breaksea Islands (Stewart Island)
- Breaksea Islands (Foveaux Strait)
- Breaksea Sound, Fiordland

=== In the United Kingdom ===
- Breaksea Point, the southernmost point of mainland Wales, UK

== Other uses ==
- Breaksea cod, a species of fish endemic to Australia
