= Breaksea Islands (New Zealand) =

Breaksea Islands may refer to:

- Breaksea Islands (Stewart Island)
- Breaksea Islands (Foveaux Strait)
- Breaksea Island (Fiordland)
