= Christensenia =

Christensenia is the scientific name of two genera of organisms and may refer to:

- Christensenia (beetle) Brinck, 1945, a genus of beetles in the family Curculionidae
- Christensenia (plant), a genus of ferns in the family Marattiaceae
- Christensia Dózsa-Farkas & Convey, 1997, a genus of oligochaete worms in the family Enchytraeidae, and a junior homonym of Christensenia Brinck, 1945, replaced by Christensenidrilus
