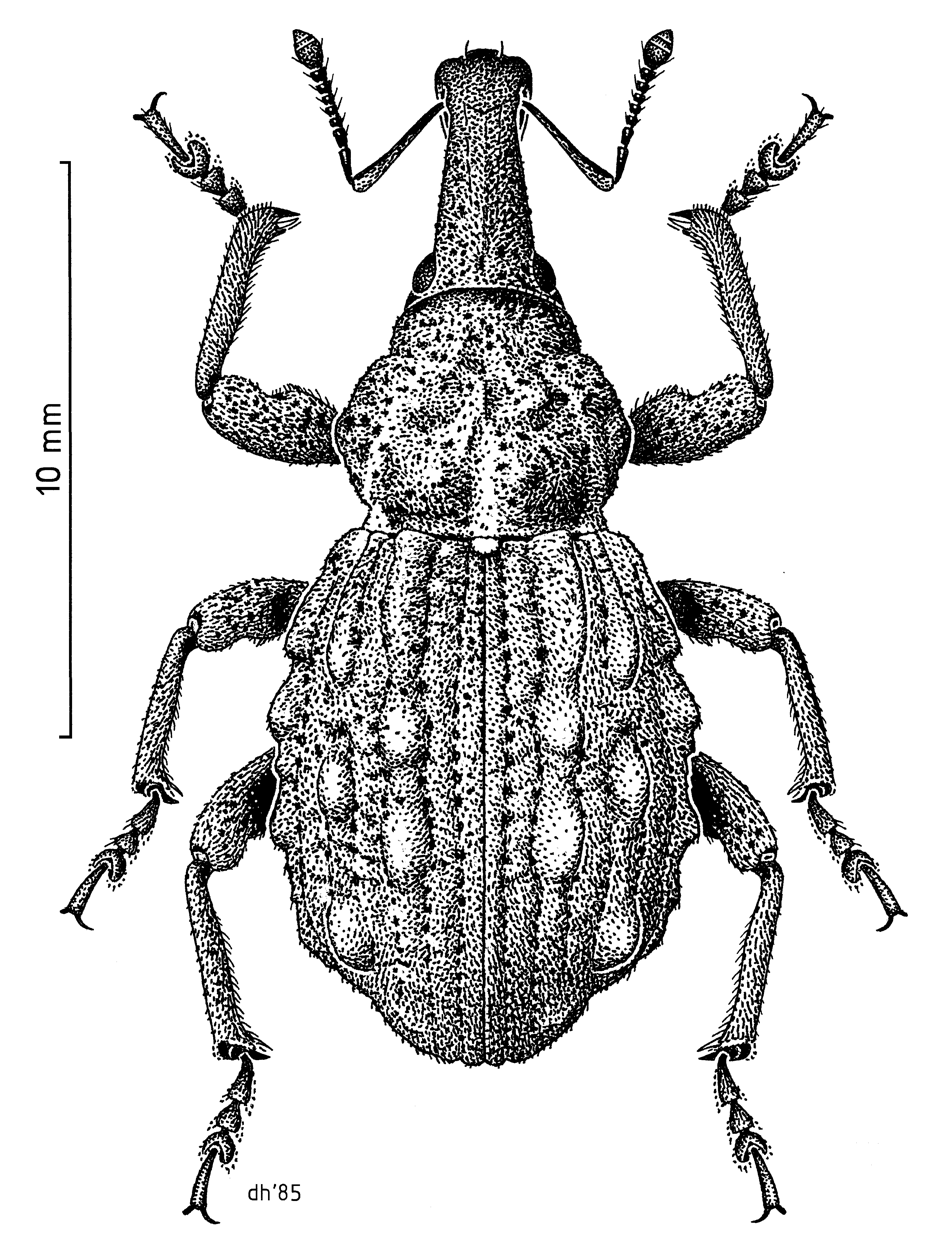
- Illustrated by Des Helmore

Conservation status
- Critically Endangered (IUCN 3.1)

Scientific classification
- Kingdom: Animalia
- Phylum: Arthropoda
- Clade: Pancrustacea
- Class: Insecta
- Order: Coleoptera
- Suborder: Polyphaga
- Infraorder: Cucujiformia
- Superfamily: Curculionoidea
- Family: Curculionidae
- Genus: Hadramphus
- Species: H. tuberculatus

Binomial name
- Hadramphus tuberculatus (Pascoe, 1877)

Synonyms
- Karocolens tuberculatus Kuschel, 1987 (disputed); Lyperobius tuberculatus Pascoe, 1877

= Hadramphus tuberculatus =

Species of beetle

Hadramphus tuberculatus (known as the Canterbury knobbled weevil, Spaniard weevil or Banks Peninsula speargrass weevil) is a rare weevil endemic to Canterbury in the South Island of New Zealand. It was thought to be extinct in 1922 but was rediscovered in 2004.

== Description ==
H. tuberculatus is a flightless weevil with a knobbed back. It reaches a length of 11.7–16.3 millimetres (0.46–0.64 in) and a width of 6.5–8.3 mm (0.26–0.33 in). It has a dark brown body with greyish-brown scales. This species tends to survive at high altitudes, specifically 670 meters, within the Department of Conservation reserve, where Aciphylla, a type of plant species, is abundant. In addition, in a study done where the ecology and conservation status of the Hadramphus tuberculatus was measured, it was found that the population size decreased from 2009 through 2011 – with the estimated population sizes being 138, 90, and 76, respectively.

== Taxonomy ==
This species was first described by Francis Pascoe in 1877 using specimens collected in Canterbury and supplied by Charles Marcus Wakefield. Hadramphus tuberculatus are characterised within the genus of weevils. They belong to the Molytini tribe which consists of four other species: H. tuberculatus, H. spinipennis Broun, H. stilbocarpae Kuschel, and H. pittospori. The Hadramphus tuberculatus are the largest weevils in terms of size and their distinction stems from having rounded tubercles on their backs. In comparison, all four species are on the risk in terms of conservation (Cruickshank et al., 2018).

== Status ==
The knobbed weevil was apparently common over the Canterbury Plains in the 1870s. Possible causes for its disappearance were the removal by farmers of spear grass (Aciphylla), its host plant, and the arrival of predatory European rats. It was last seen in 1922, and was considered extinct until it was rediscovered in late 2004 by research students of the University of Canterbury at Burkes Pass near Lake Tekapo, South Canterbury, New Zealand. It is now listed as nationally endangered by the New Zealand Department of Conservation, and as critically endangered in the IUCN Red List. A detailed ecological study conducted by researchers at Lincoln University in 2009–2011 estimated the population size at Burkes Pass to be only 138 individuals in 2009, decreasing each year to 76 in 2011. As of 20 December 2024 a new, second population of H.tuberculatus has been found in the high country behind Mount Somers / Te Kiekie.

== Gallery of images ==
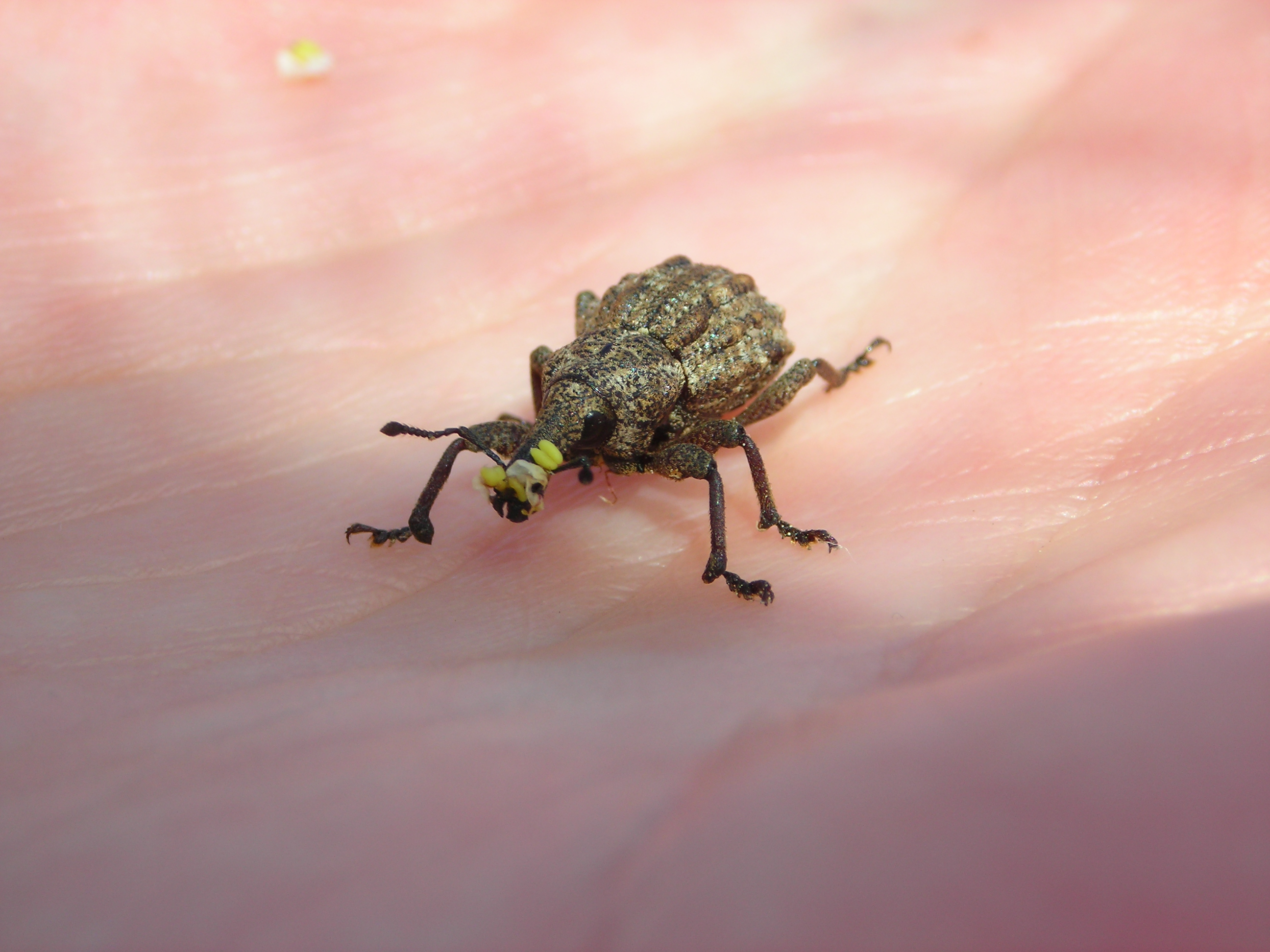
Hadramphus tuberculatus with pollen from Aciphylla aurea flower on rostrum

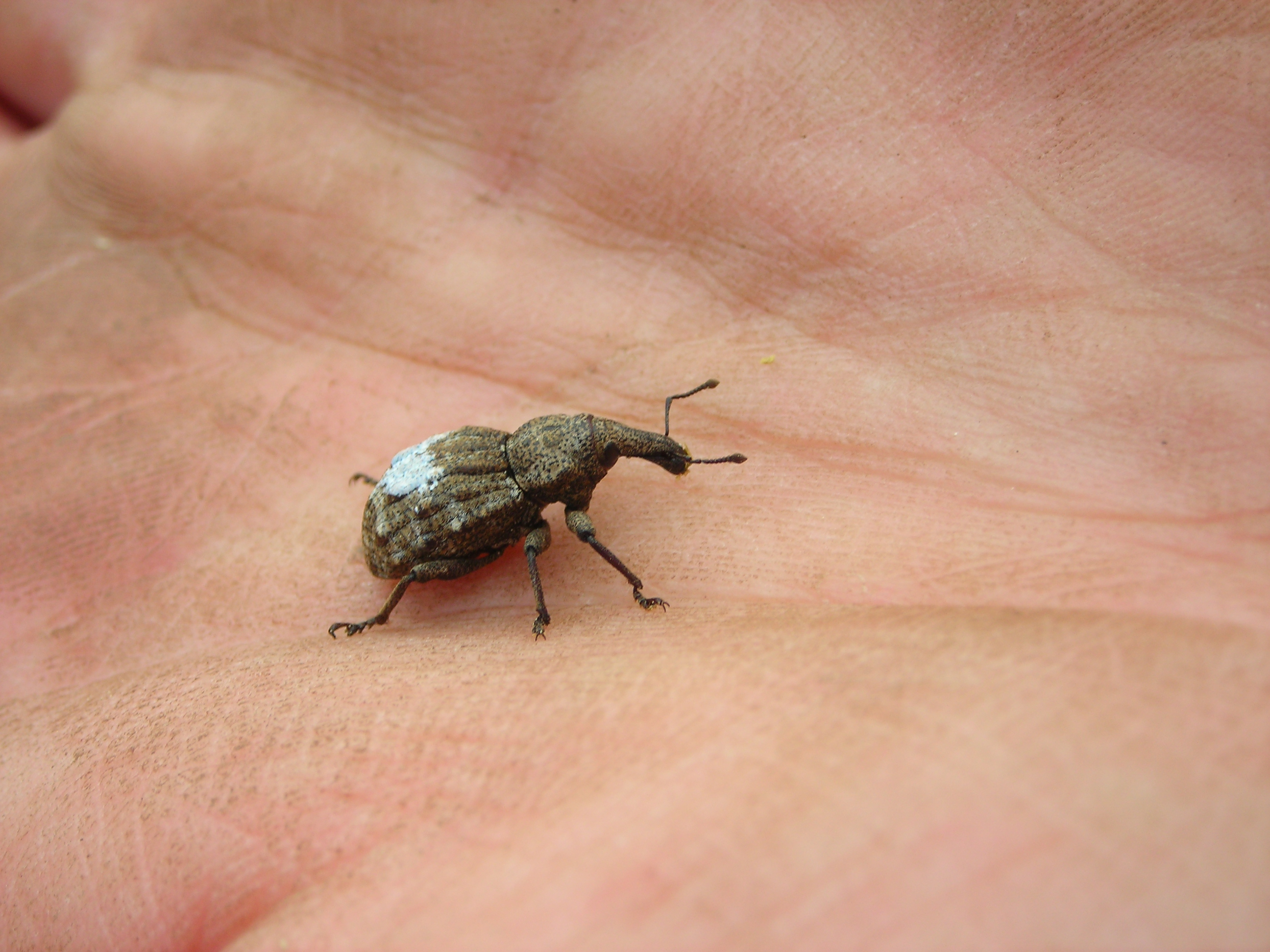
Hadramphus tuberculatus recaptured during mark recapture study at Burkes Pass Scenic Reserve

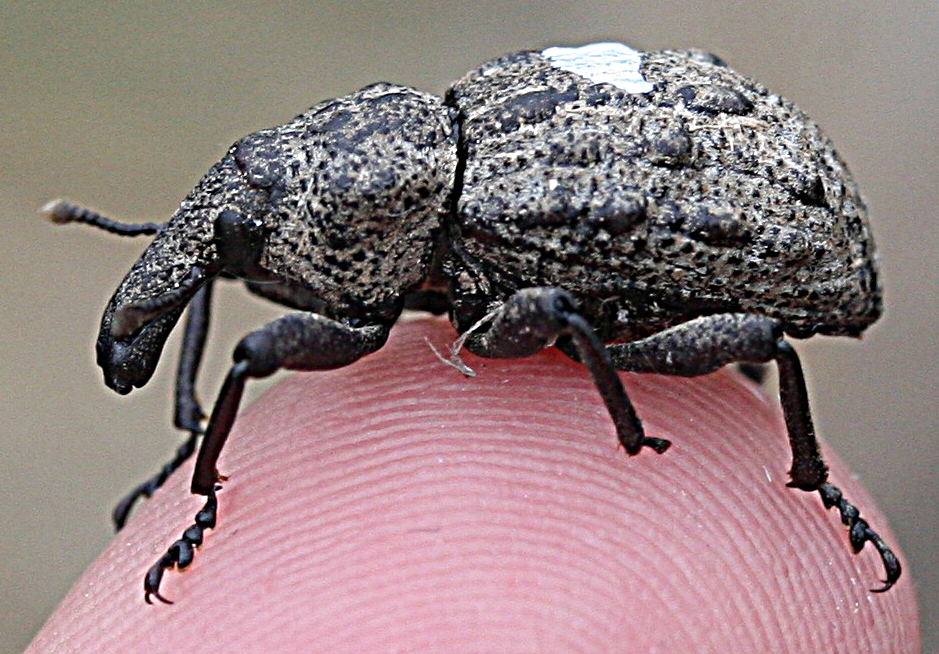

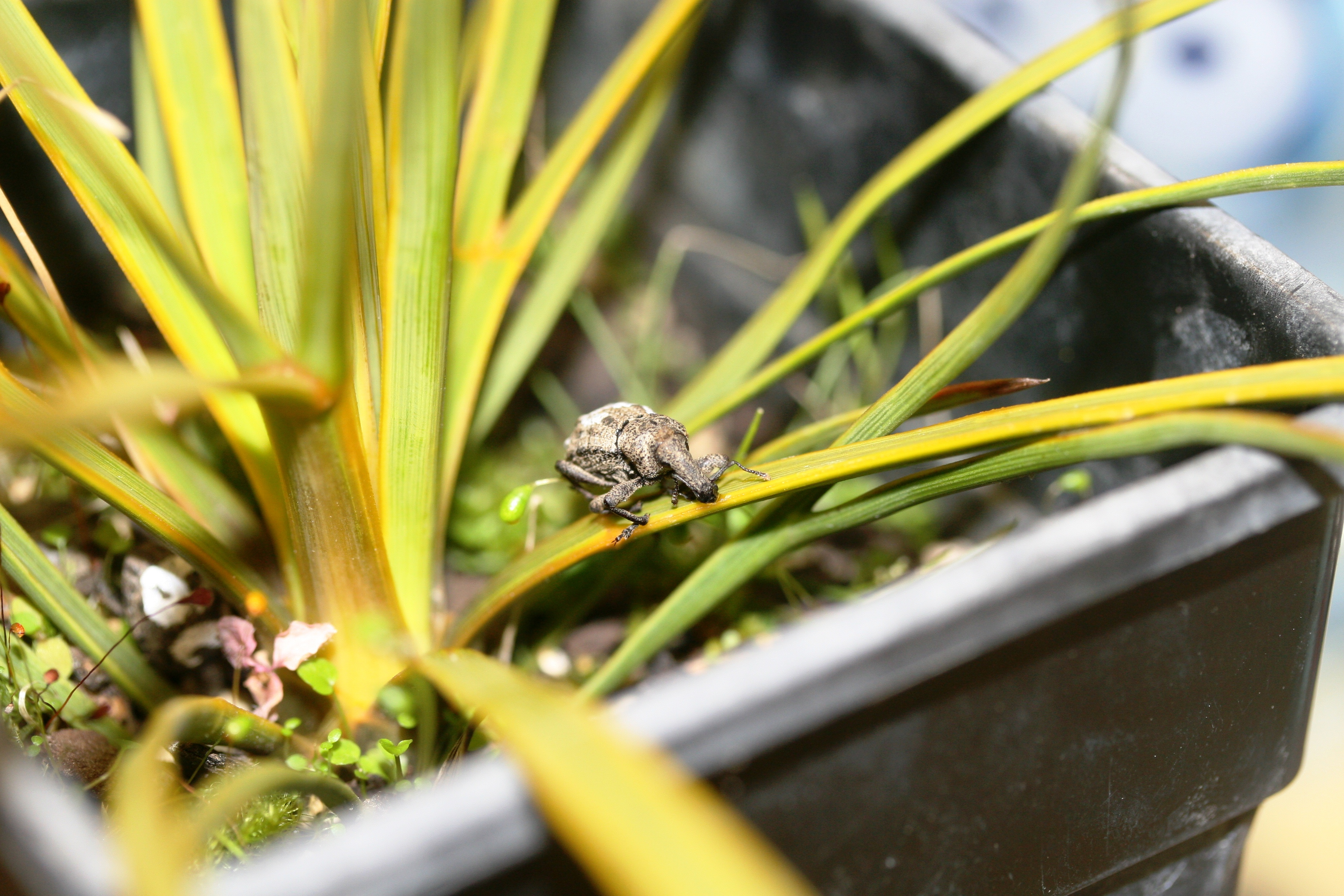
Captive rearing study of Hadramphus tuberculatus on a young Aciphylla aurea in an enclosure at Lincoln University

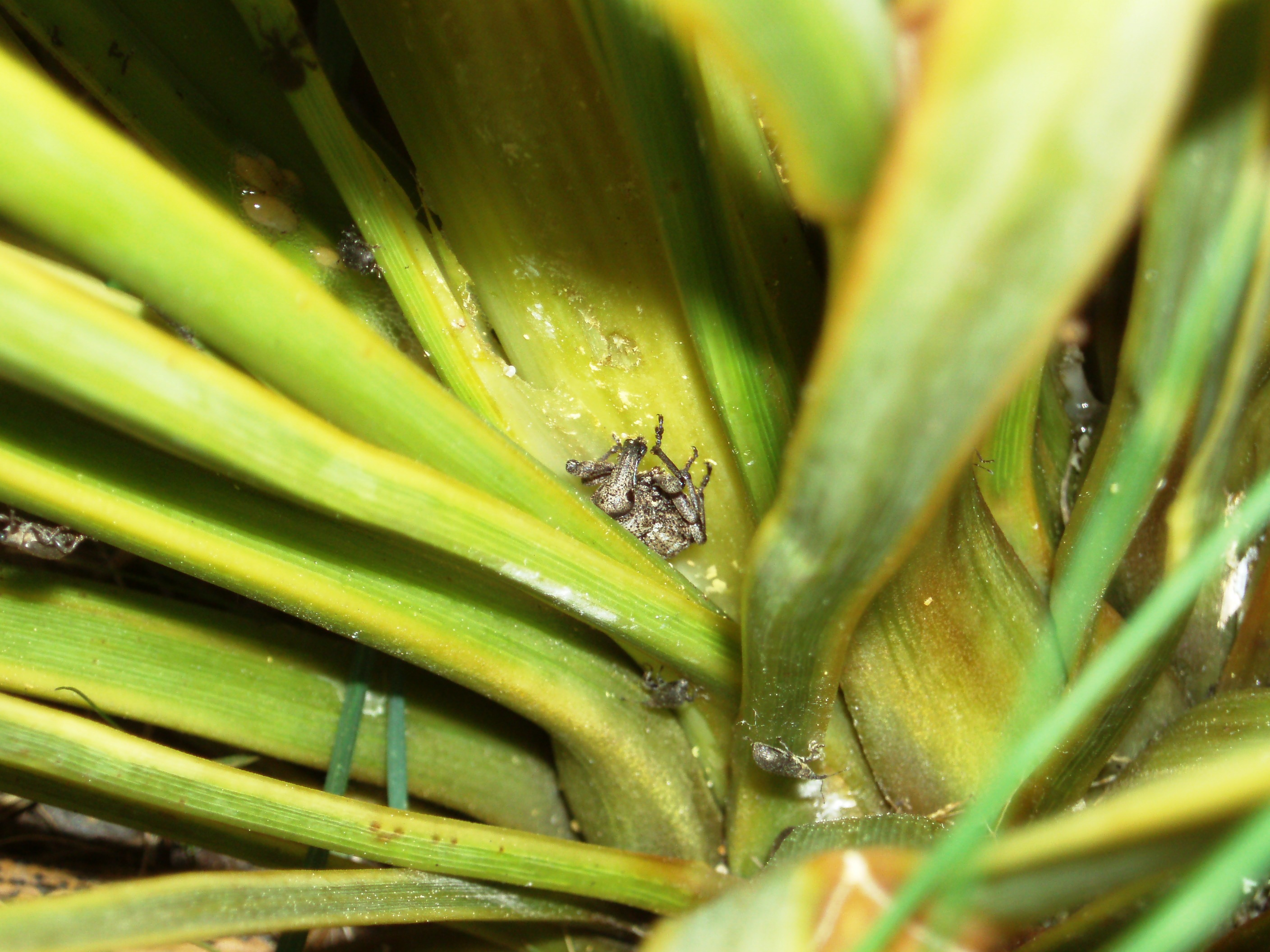
Hadramphus tuberculatus on Aciphylla aurea.

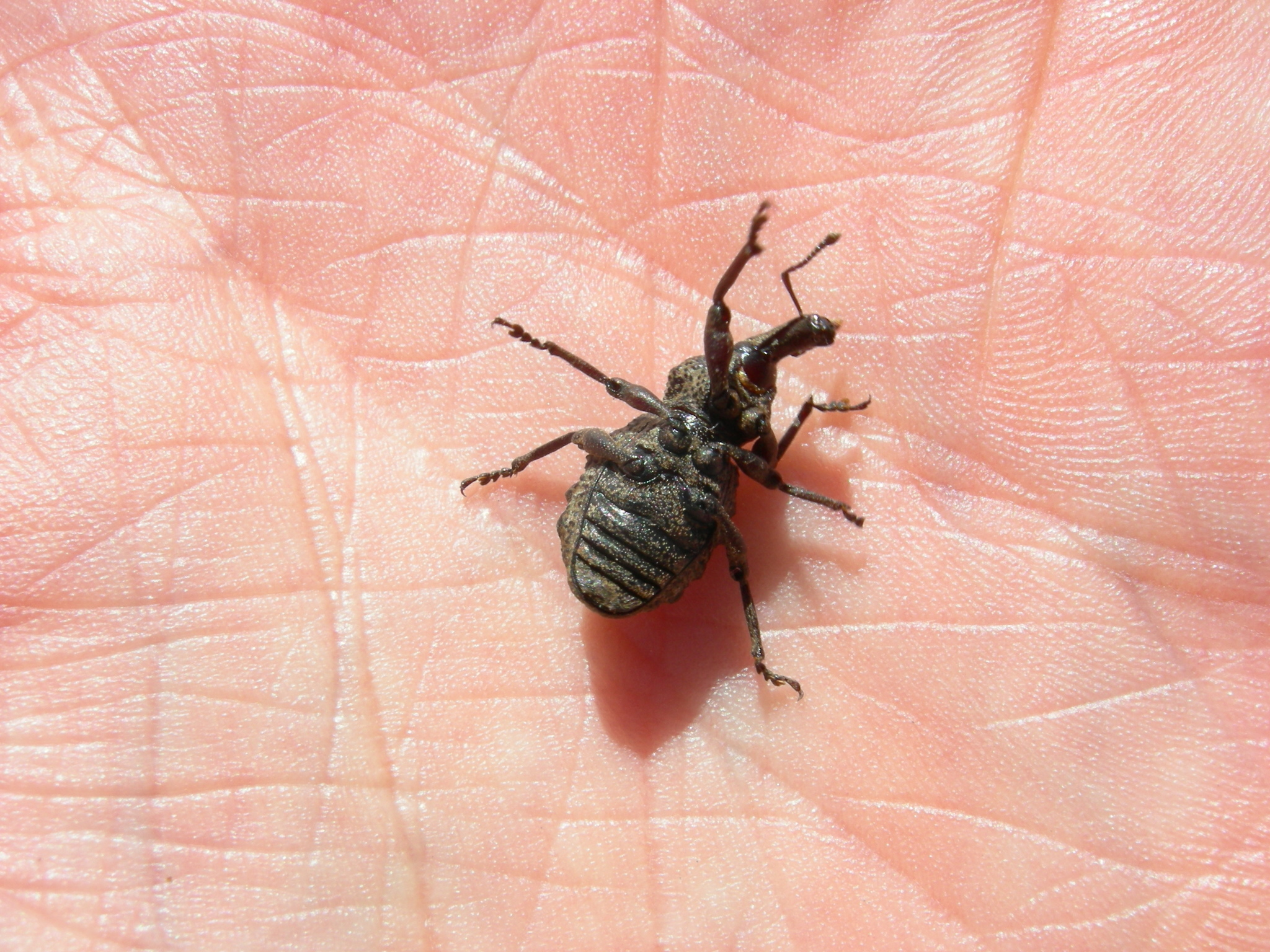
