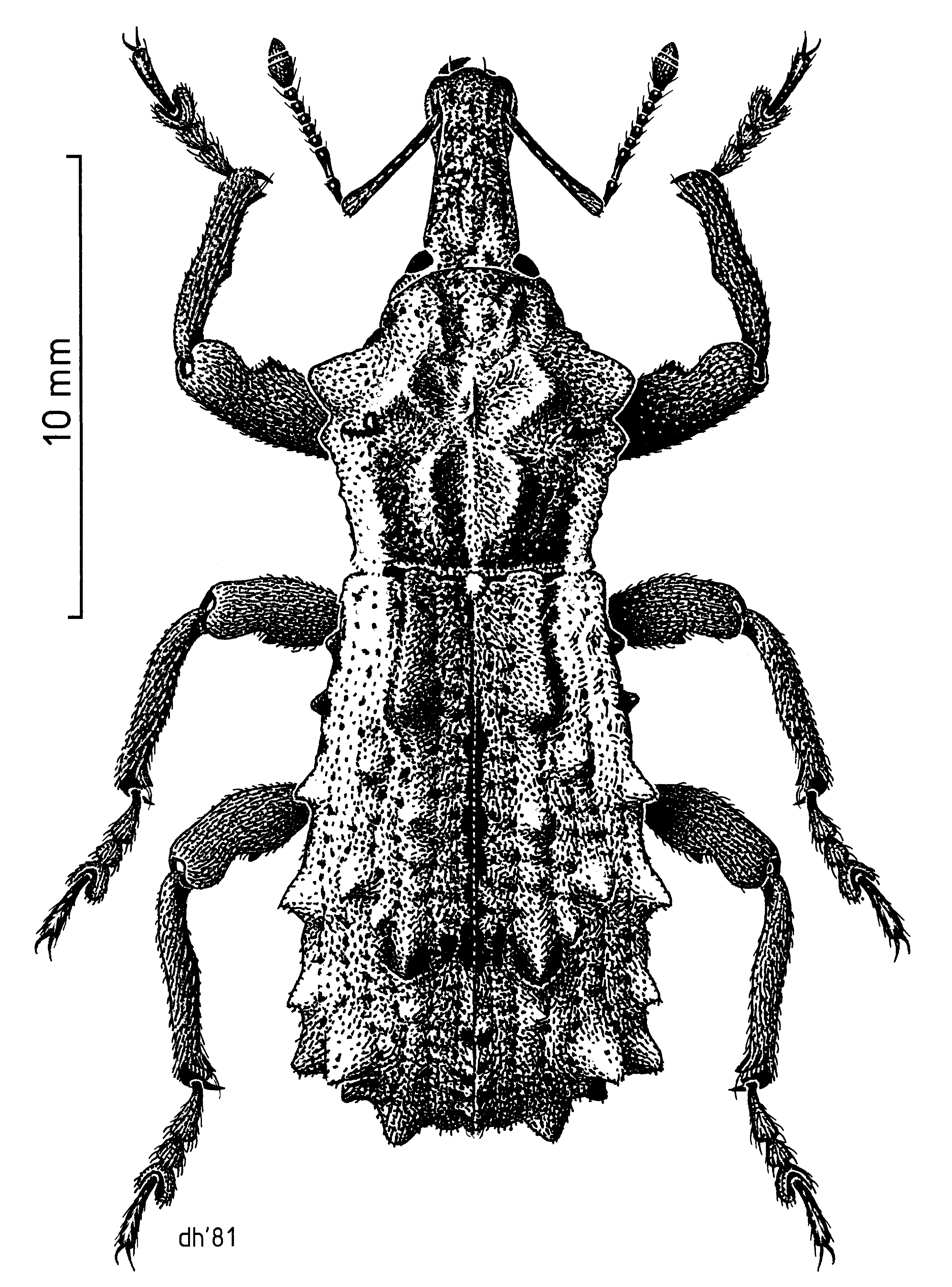
- Hadramphus pittospori illustrated by Des Helmore

Scientific classification
- Kingdom: Animalia
- Phylum: Arthropoda
- Class: Insecta
- Order: Coleoptera
- Suborder: Polyphaga
- Infraorder: Cucujiformia
- Family: Curculionidae
- Subfamily: Molytinae
- Tribe: Molytini
- Genus: Hadramphus; Broun, 1911

Species
- H. spinipennis (type); H. pittospori; H. tuberculatus; H. stilbocarpae

Synonyms
- Karocolens Kuschel, 1987

= Hadramphus =

Genus of beetles

Hadramphus (synonym: Karocolens), commonly known as knobbled weevils, is a genus of flightless molytine weevils from the family Curculionidae. It is endemic to New Zealand and consists of four species.

The type species Hadramphus spinipennis was designated by Thomas Broun in 1911. Hadramphus pittospori was described by Guillermo Kuschel within the new genus Karocolens in 1987 but placed by Robin Craw into the genus Hadramphus in 1999. Hadramphus tuberculatus was described by Francis Polkinghorne Pascoe as Lyperobius tuberculatus in 1877 but transferred by Kuschel into the genus Hadramphus in 1971. The fourth species Hadramphus stilbocarpae was described by Kuschel in 1971.

All four species are relatively large with a length ranging from 11.7 to 23 mm. They are predominantly dark brown and characterized by triangular or rounded tubercles on their flanks and on their upperparts. H. pittospori is confined to Poor Knights Islands, H. spinipennis is endemic to the Chatham Islands, H. stilbocarpae lives on Breaksea Island, Fiordland, Resolution Island and Puysegur Point, islands around Stewart Island / Rakiura (Bird Island and Big South Cape Island) and the sub-Antarctic Snares Islands. The rarest of them is Hadramphus tuberculatus. It is endemic to the Burkes Pass Scenic Reserve in the Canterbury Plains and was not seen between 1922 and 2004.
