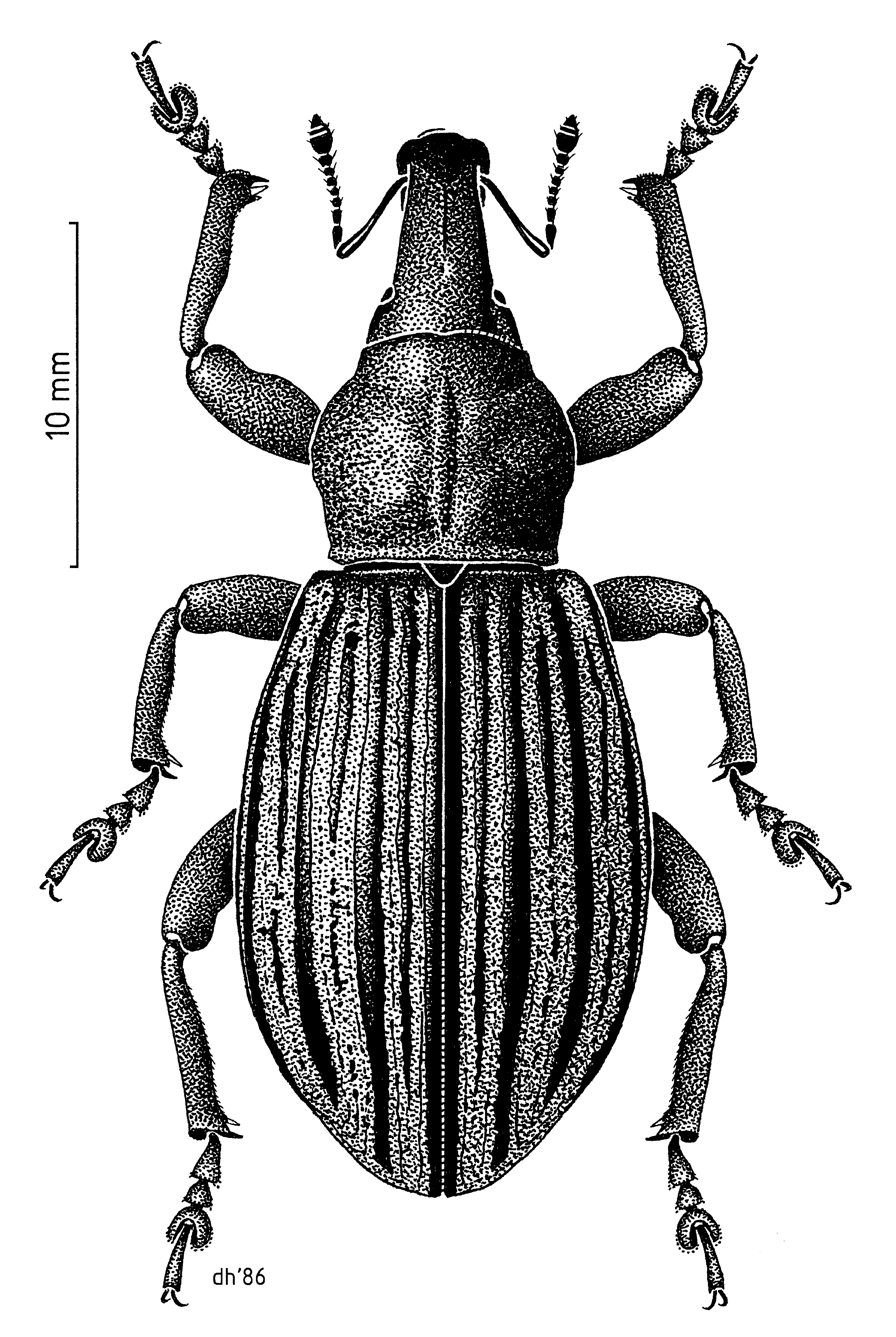

Scientific classification
- Domain: Eukaryota
- Kingdom: Animalia
- Phylum: Arthropoda
- Class: Insecta
- Order: Coleoptera
- Suborder: Polyphaga
- Infraorder: Cucujiformia
- Family: Curculionidae
- Genus: Lyperobius
- Species: L. clarkei

Binomial name
- Lyperobius clarkei Craw, 1999

= Lyperobius clarkei =

Species of beetle

Lyperobius clarkei is a flightless weevil found in alpine areas of Buller and Nelson in the South Island of New Zealand.

== Taxonomy ==
This species was first collected in 1964 by J.I.Townsend and A.K.Walker on Mount Arthur, Nelson from Aciphylla ferox. The holotype specimen is held in the New Zealand Arthropod Collection and was described by Robin Craw in 1999 and named Lyperobius clarkei after the entomologist C.E. Clarke. It is a member of the speargrass or Lyperobius weevils in the sub-family Molytinae.

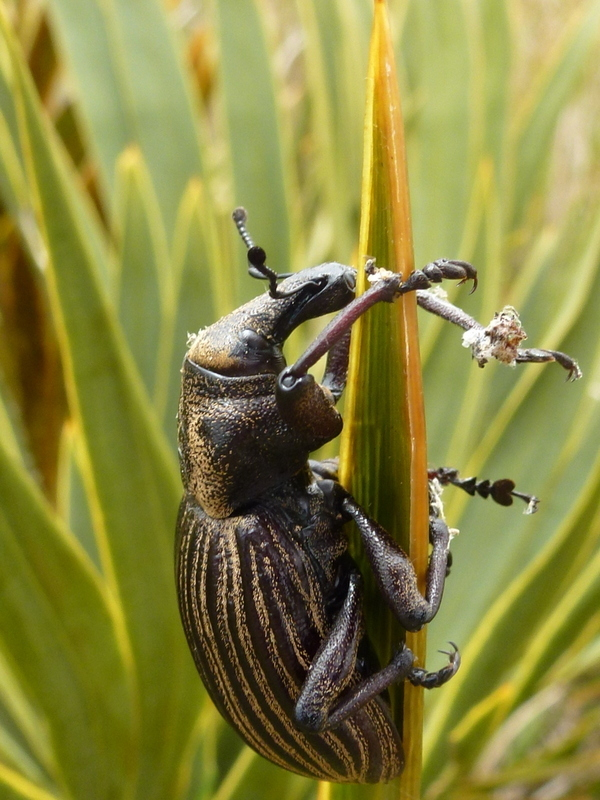
Lyperobius clarkei

== Description ==
Lyperobius clarkei has a black body with pale yellow/white scales which are at their most dense on the pronotum, head and on the elytral intervals. These white scales form stripes on the abdomen. Its body ranges in length from 20.5–28 mm. This species is sympatric with Lyperobius fallax, but can be distinguished by its larger size. Like other New Zealand Molytinae, this weevil is flightless. Its larvae have a creamy-white body with a dark red-black head.

== Distribution and habitat ==
This species is found in the Nelson and Buller mountain ranges, including Mount Arthur, Mount Owen and the Matiri ranges. It lives in the subalpine zone, associated with Aciphylla ferox or fierce speargrass.

== Diet ==
The only known host plant for this species is Aciphylla ferox. Adults of other Lyperobius species browse on leaves, flower stems and seeds of Aciphylla.
