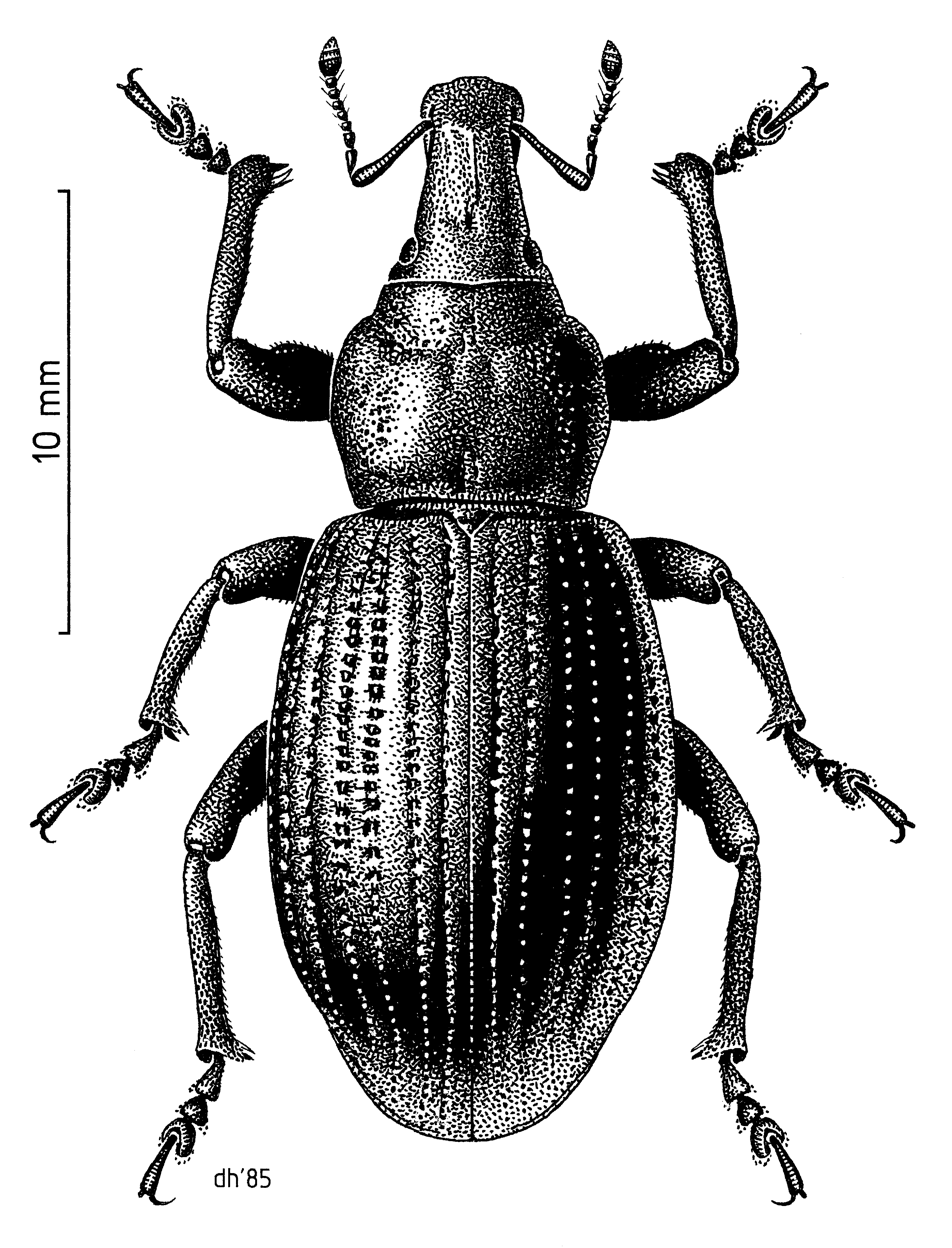
- Illustration by Des Helmore

Conservation status
- Not Threatened (NZ TCS)

Scientific classification
- Kingdom: Animalia
- Phylum: Arthropoda
- Clade: Pancrustacea
- Class: Insecta
- Order: Coleoptera
- Suborder: Polyphaga
- Infraorder: Cucujiformia
- Superfamily: Curculionoidea
- Family: Curculionidae
- Genus: Lyperobius
- Species: L. huttoni

Binomial name
- Lyperobius huttoni Pascoe, 1876

Synonyms
- Range of Lyperobius huttoni in New Zealand

= Lyperobius huttoni =

Species of beetle

Lyperobius huttoni (known as Hutton's speargrass weevil, or simply speargrass weevil) is a New Zealand weevil found in alpine areas of the South Island and at sea level around the Wellington coast. It feeds only on speargrass (Aciphylla). Weevils from the endangered Wellington population have been translocated to predator-free Mana Island.

== Taxonomy ==
This species was first described by Francis Pascoe in 1876. Pascoe based his description on material collected in Tarndale, near Nelson, by Frederick Hutton, and named the species in his honour. Hutton collected it on Aciphylla colensoi. The lectotype specimen is held at the Natural History Museum, London.

== Description ==
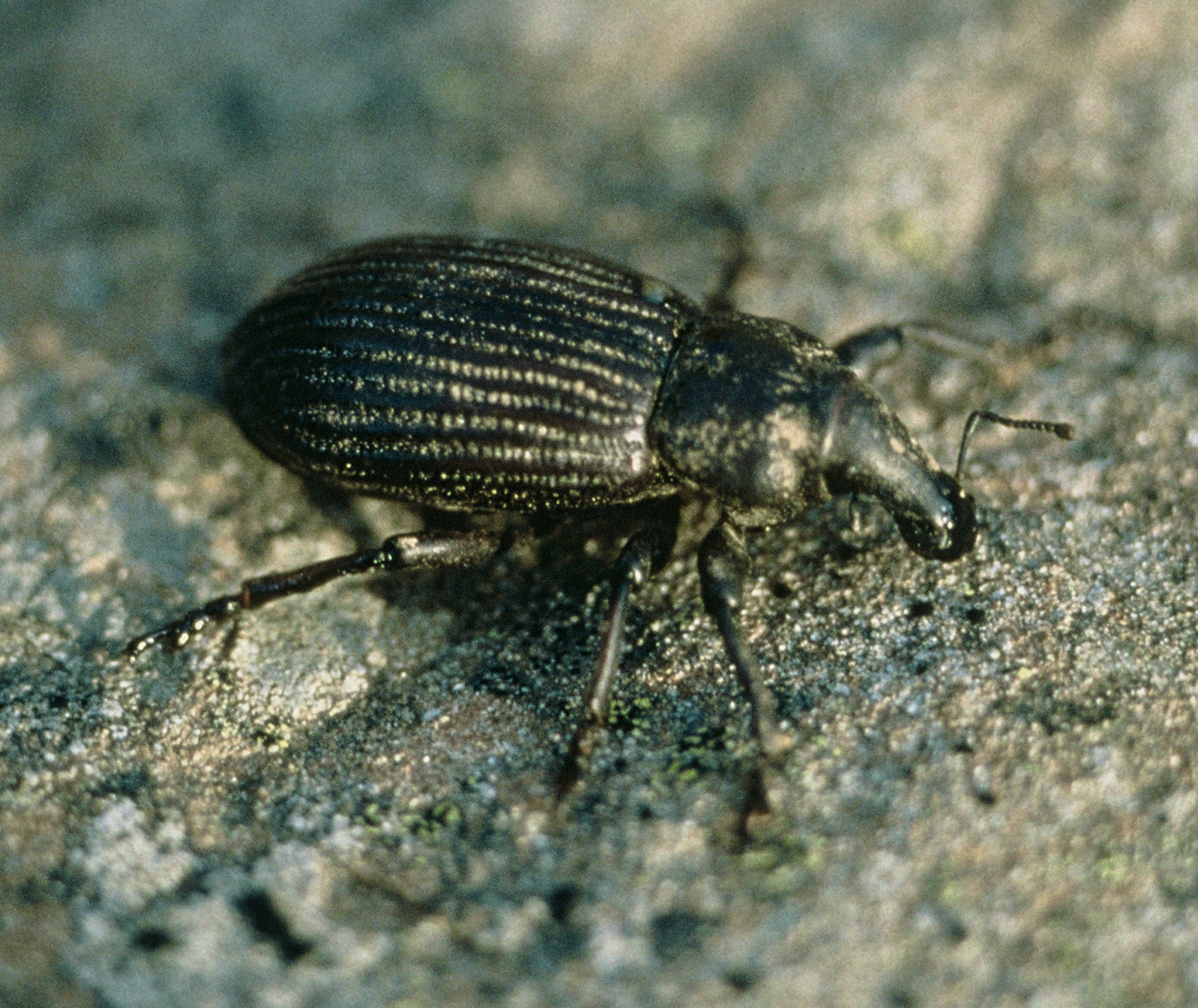
Lyperobius huttoni photographed by Greg Sherley

This weevil is dark-coloured and about 2 cm long, with a short thick rostrum. Males and females are difficult to distinguish externally; females are slightly larger, and have a larger and more rounded fifth abdominal ventrite. George Hudson, comparing this species with Lyperobius hudsoni, described the species as follows:

(25–26 mm) Larger with relatively shorter and broader rostrum; the elytra have six rows of deep punctiform impressions; general colour is black slightly tinged with reddish, almost without clothing.

== Distribution and habitat ==
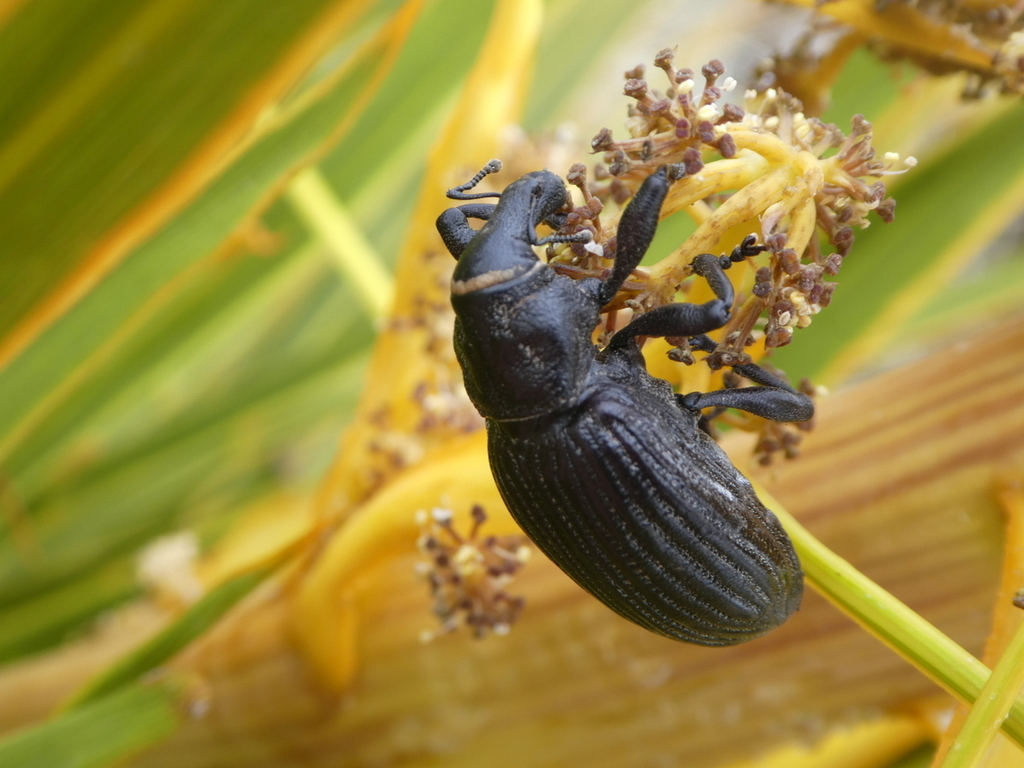
Lyperobius huttoni feeding on male flowers

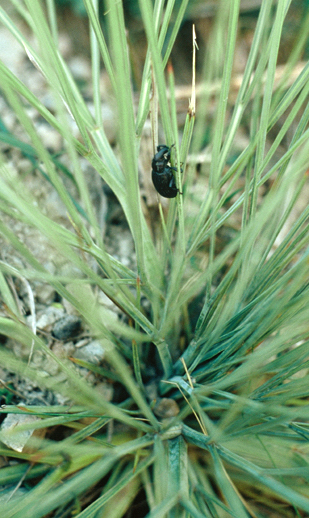
Lyperobius huttoni on speargrass

Lyperobius huttoni lives in subalpine and high country herbfields and tussock grassland in the eastern South Island, from the Black Birch range in Marlborough to the Hunters Hills in South Canterbury. A North Island population around the Wellington south coast was discovered in 1917, where the normally-alpine host species Aciphylla squarrosa can be found growing on exposed coastal cliffs almost to sea level. This species is the only Lyperobius species found on both the North and South Islands of New Zealand. It is thought that the distribution either side of Cook Strait could be due to migration of weevils during the last glacial period, when sea levels were lower, or by rafting on debris originating in its alpine habitat. A number of insects from this Wellington population have also been translocated to Mana Island.

== Behaviour and host species ==
L. huttoni feeds on the speargrass species Aciphylla squarrosa, A. colensoi, and A. aurea. Adults are active during the day, and are most easily found on foliage on calm, warm, sunny days, feeding on leaves and flower stalks. The weevils leave notches on the leaf edges of their host plant and sometimes eat leaves completely through. Larvae burrow into the soil and feed on the Aciphylla taproot, and can be found in the surrounding dead and decomposing foliage at ground level. Evidence of their presence are dead or dying speargrass plants or deep oval notches on leaf petioles. The weevil spends a year as a larva before constructing a chamber in which it pupates for two weeks. After emerging, the teneral adult weevils can stay in the chamber for eight months before emerging, and live for over two years.

== Disease ==
During research into the captive breeding of L. huttoni it was discovered that the weevil is susceptible to a species of fungus in the genus Beauvaria. This was one of the main causes of mortality in the study.

== Conservation ==
The species is one of the invertebrates "declared to be animals" in the 1980 amendment of the Wildlife Act 1953, and thus legally protected. They are flightless, slow-moving beetles, vulnerable to being eaten by mice and rats, and their host plants are susceptible to browsing by mammals such as sheep, pigs, and goats. One population at Ōwhiro Bay on the Wellington coast was destroyed when their entire habitat was turned into a quarry.

The population of this species found in Marlborough is regarded as stable, but in Canterbury the combined effects of predation by rodents and habitat destruction have caused the population of this species to decline.

The Wellington population once extended from Island Bay to the Karori Stream, but by the 1980s was facing local extinction. Between 2001 and 2004, an attempt was made to breed this species in captivity. High mortality of adult weevils and a failure of the larvae to survive into adulthood meant that the project was unsuccessful in breeding any adults for release. By 2006, the Wellington population was estimated by the Department of Conservation (DOC) to be less than 150 adults. DOC translocated 40 adult L. huttoni from the Wellington south coast to nearby Mana Island over the summer of 2006–2007. A survey in 2015 revealed abundant signs of feeding, and one weevil was seen 400 m from the release site.
