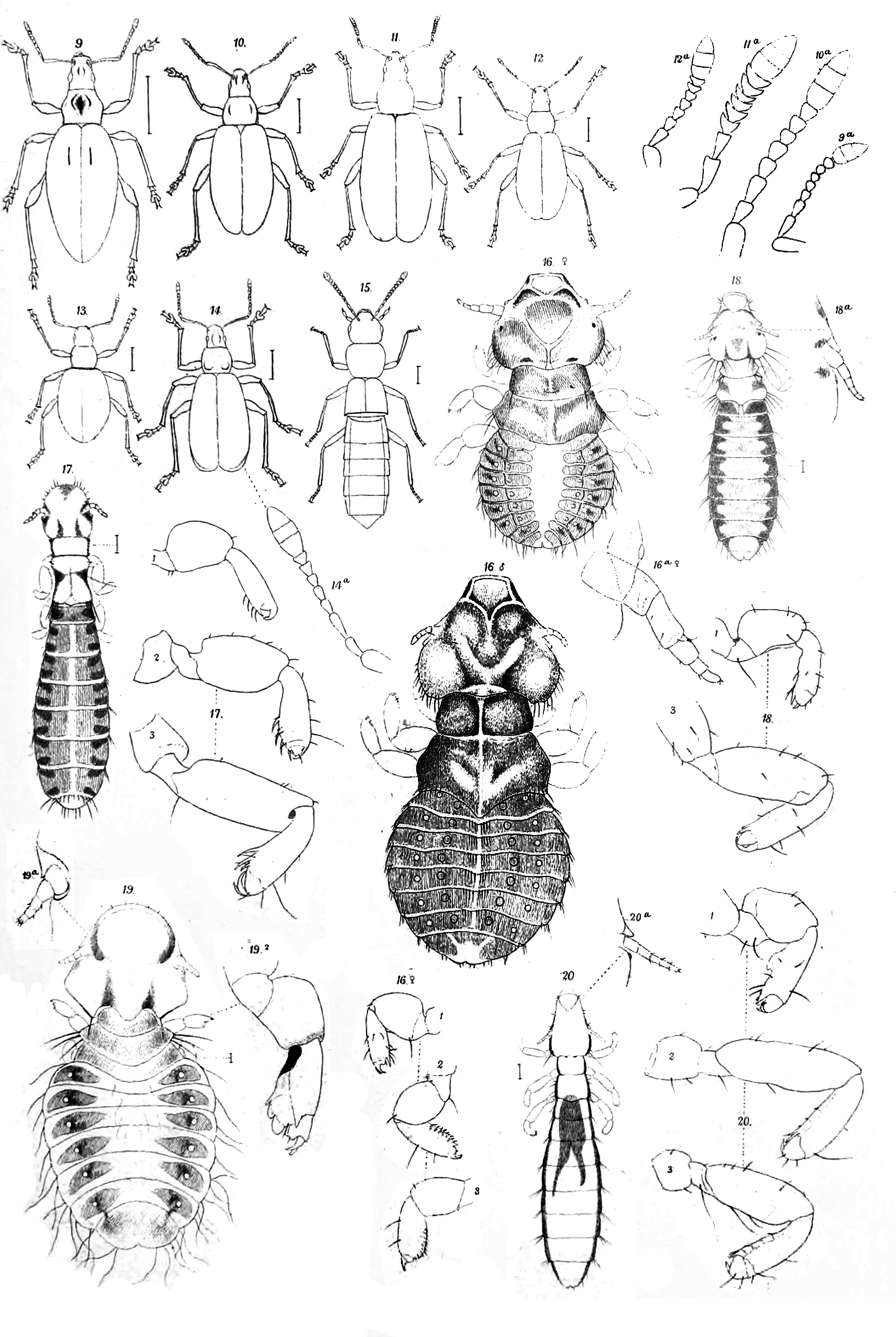

Scientific classification
- Domain: Eukaryota
- Kingdom: Animalia
- Phylum: Arthropoda
- Class: Insecta
- Order: Coleoptera
- Suborder: Polyphaga
- Infraorder: Cucujiformia
- Family: Curculionidae
- Subfamily: Entiminae
- Tribe: Ectemnorhinini; Lacordaire, 1863

Genera
- See text

= Ectemnorhinini =

Tribe of beetles

Ectemnorhinini is a weevil tribe in the subfamily Entiminae.

== Genera ==
Bothrometopus – Canonopsis – Christensenia – Disker – Ectemnorhinus – Pachnobium – Palirhoeus
