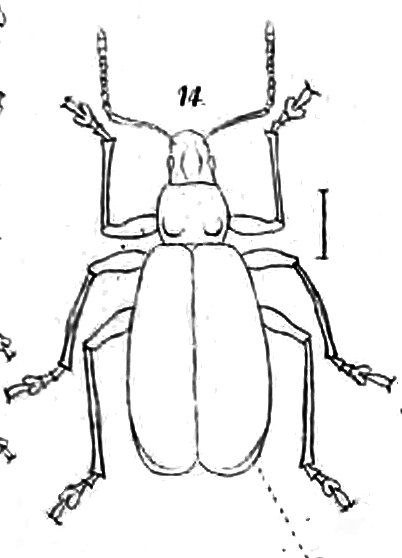
- Palirhoeus eatoni

Scientific classification
- Kingdom: Animalia
- Phylum: Arthropoda
- Clade: Pancrustacea
- Class: Insecta
- Order: Coleoptera
- Suborder: Polyphaga
- Infraorder: Cucujiformia
- Superfamily: Curculionoidea
- Family: Curculionidae
- Genus: Palirhoeus; Kuschel 1971
- Species: P. eatoni

Binomial name
- Palirhoeus eatoni (Waterhouse, 1876)

Synonyms
- Ectemnorrhinus eatoni

= Palirhoeus =

Species of beetle

Palirhoeus is a monospecific genus of beetle found on islands in the Sub-Antarctic Indian Ocean.

== Taxonomy ==
Palirhoeus eatoni is the only species within the genus Palirhoeus. This weevil species was described in 1876 by the British entomologist C. O. Waterhouse who placed it in the genus Ectemnorrhinus. In 1971, Chilean-New Zealand entomologist Guillermo Kuschel created the monospecific genus Palirhoeus.

== Description ==
Palirhoeus eatoni is a weevil in the tribe Ectemnorhinini with seven larval instars. Adult females are on average larger (4.4 mm) than males (3.9mm). Adults are black or dark brown with a slight metallic sheen. Thorax has keel-like ridge.

== Biology ==
Palirhoeus eatoni lives on the shoreline (in the littoral zone), where it feeds on marine algae and lichens. The species is tolerant of cold but cannot survive freezing. This beetle is unusual in that it needs to osmoregulate to survive in both fresh and seawater.

== Distribution ==
This weevil species lives on islands in the Sub-Antarctic Indian Ocean: Heard Island, Crozet, Kerguelen, Prince Edward and McDonald Islands. A genetic signature of isolation by distance in this species suggests that it disperses via rafting.

== Conservation status ==
Palirhoeus eatoni is found on two of the islands in the Prince Edward island group, i.e. Marion Island (with mice) and Prince Edward Island (without mice) but as they are not eaten by mice the individuals from the different populations on the two islands cannot be distinguished on body size. However, weevil samples collected over 50 years show signs of morphological change in this species (reduction in body size) associated with climate change.
