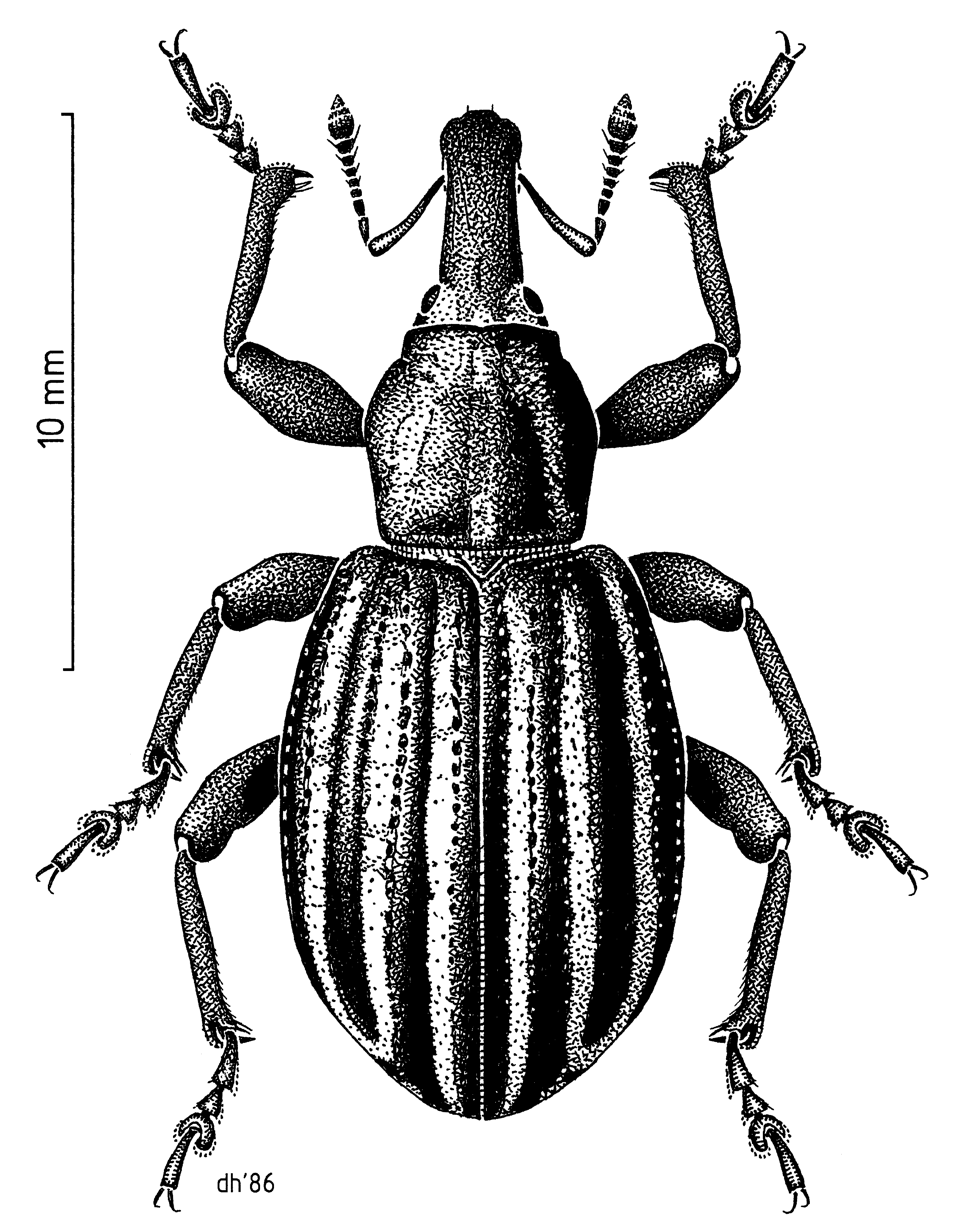

Scientific classification
- Kingdom: Animalia
- Phylum: Arthropoda
- Class: Insecta
- Order: Coleoptera
- Suborder: Polyphaga
- Infraorder: Cucujiformia
- Family: Curculionidae
- Genus: Lyperobius
- Species: L. hudsoni

Binomial name
- Lyperobius hudsoni Broun, 1914

= Lyperobius hudsoni =

Species of beetle

Lyperobius hudsoni is a flightless weevil found in alpine areas of Central Otago and Otago Lakes in the South Island of New Zealand.

== Taxonomy ==
This species was first collected by George Vernon Hudson in 1894. It was described by Thomas Broun in 1914 and named after receiving a pair of specimens from Hudson. The lectotype specimen is held at the Natural History Museum, London and was collected by Hudson from the Humboldt Range in Central Otago.

== Description ==
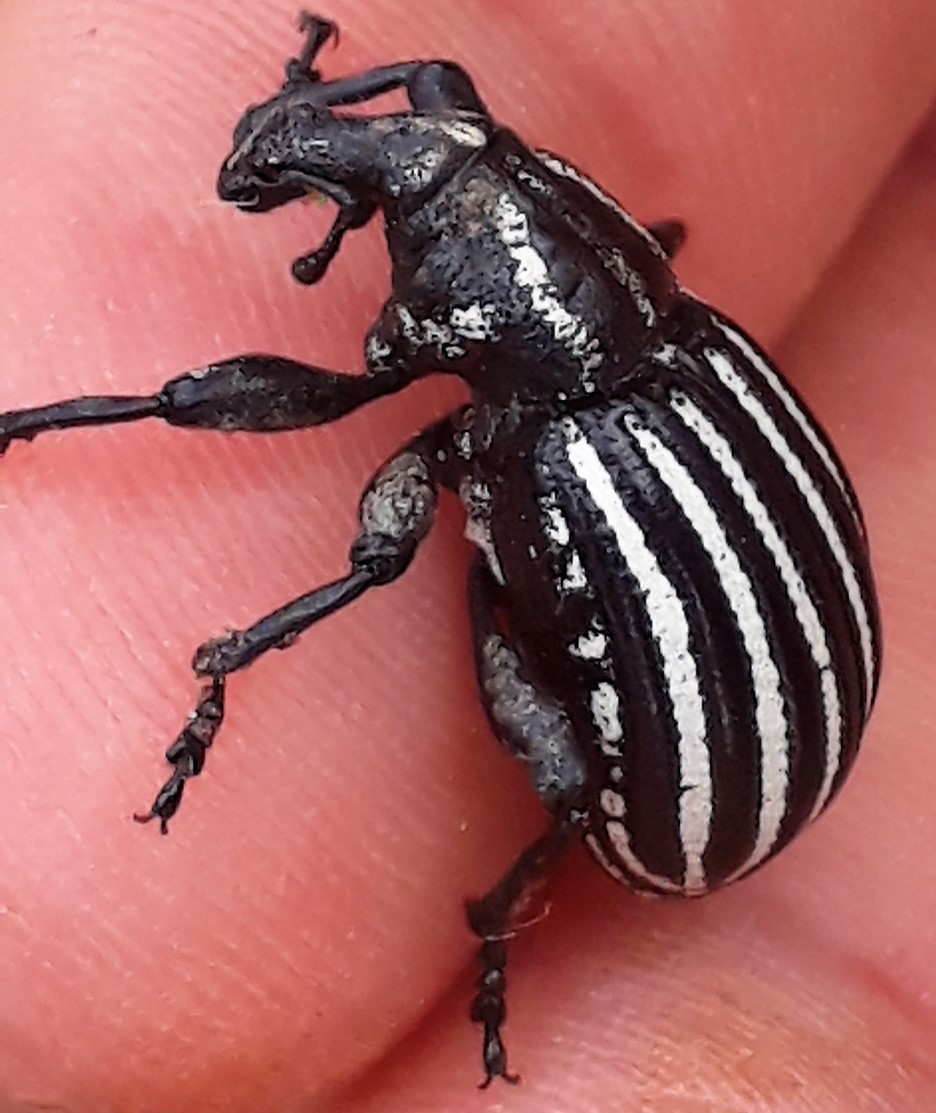
Lyperobius hudsoni

This weevil has a black body with distinct white or yellowish scales on the sides and middle of the pronotum and forming stripes on the elytra. These scales are easily rubbed off so that the characteristic stripes on the elytra are almost absent. In his original description, Broun described it as "remarkable on account of its elongated thorax, rostrum and scrobes." It has a relatively long and thin rostrum. Its size ranges from 11.5–21.5 mm.

== Distribution and habitat ==
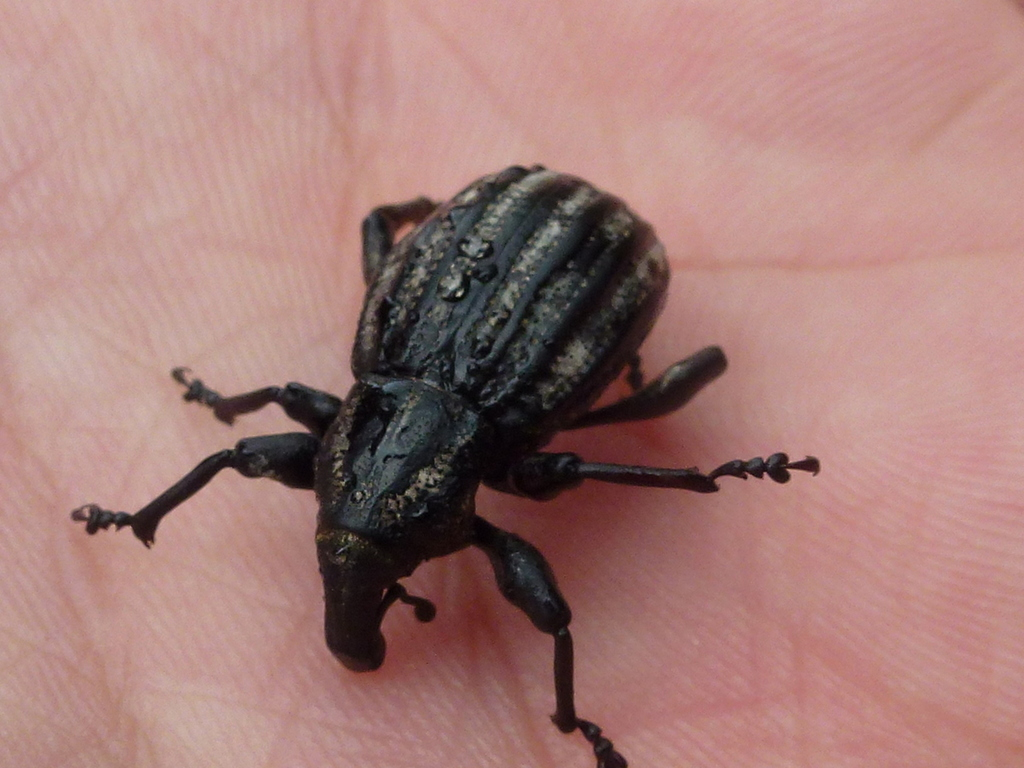
Lyperobius hudsoni with missing scales

Lyperobius hudsoni is found in the Central Otago and Otago Lakes mountain ranges from 1600–1900 m above sea level. It is found associated with its alpine host plants in the family Apiaceae.

== Diet ==
The host plants for this species are all from the family Apiaceae and include a range of speargrass species including Aciphylla dobsonii, A. lecomtei, A. simplex and A. imbricata. It is also found on Anisotome flexuosa. Like other Lyperobius species, adult L. hudsoni feed on the leaves, flower stems and developing seeds of speargrass plants. Larvae of Lyperobius weevils feed on the thick roots of their host plants, although larvae of L. hudsoni have been found feeding on leaf bases and crowns.

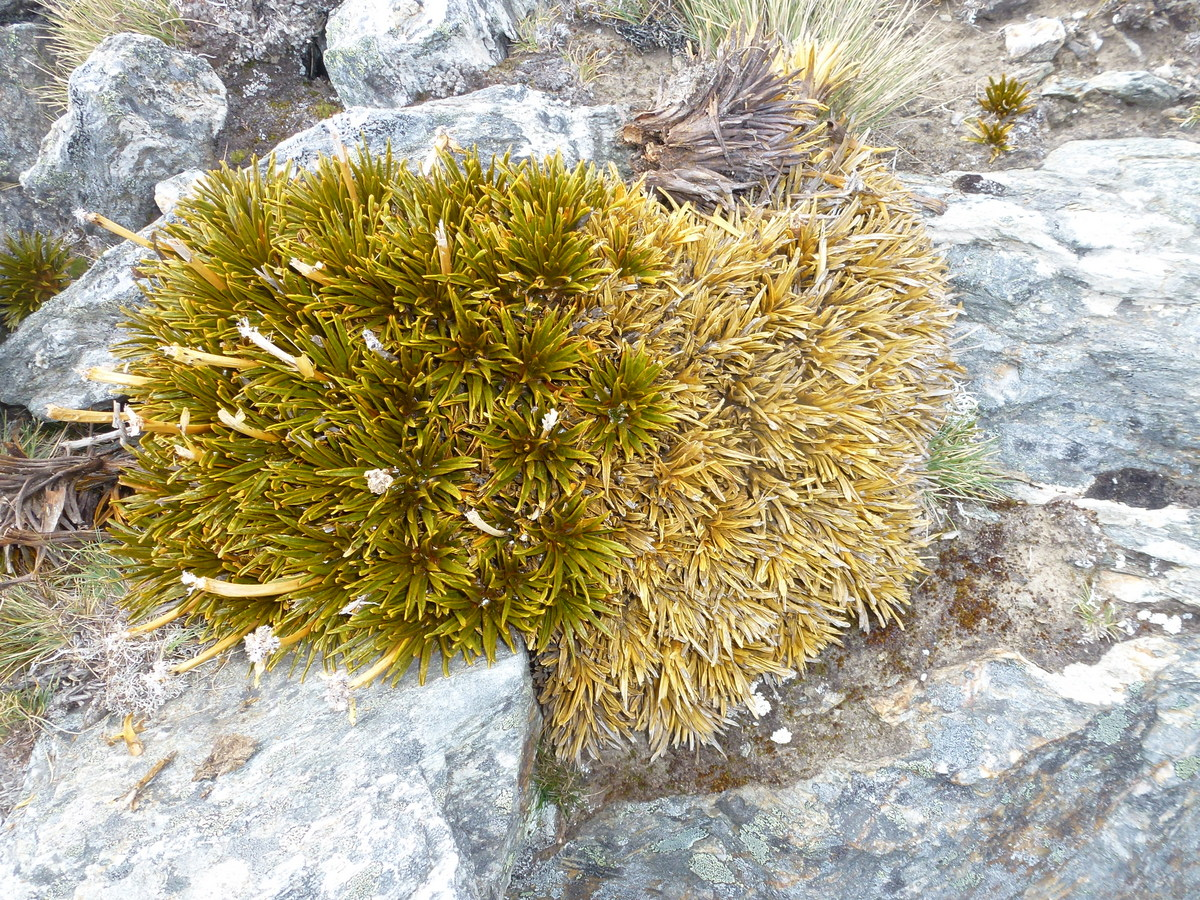
Aciphylla simplex, a host plant for L. hudsoni.

== Conservation and threats ==
Habitat degradation, changes in land use and browsing of the host speargrass plants by introduced mammals are threats to Lyperobius weevils. Unlike Lyperobius huttoni, this species is not protected under Schedule 7 of The 1953 Wildlife Act, despite their vulnerability to rodent predation by being large and flightless.
