= Christensenia (beetle) =

Scientific classification
- Kingdom: Animalia
- Phylum: Arthropoda
- Class: Insecta
- Order: Coleoptera
- Suborder: Polyphaga
- Infraorder: Cucujiformia
- Family: Curculionidae
- Tribe: Ectemnorhinini
- Genus: Christensenia; Brinck, 1945

Species
- Christensenia antarctica; Christensenia dreuxi

Genus of beetles

Christensenia is a genus of weevils in the family Curculionidae.
