= Breaksea Sound =

Fiord on the southwestern coast of South Island, New Zealand

Te Puaitaha / Breaksea Sound
- Te Puaitaha (Māori)
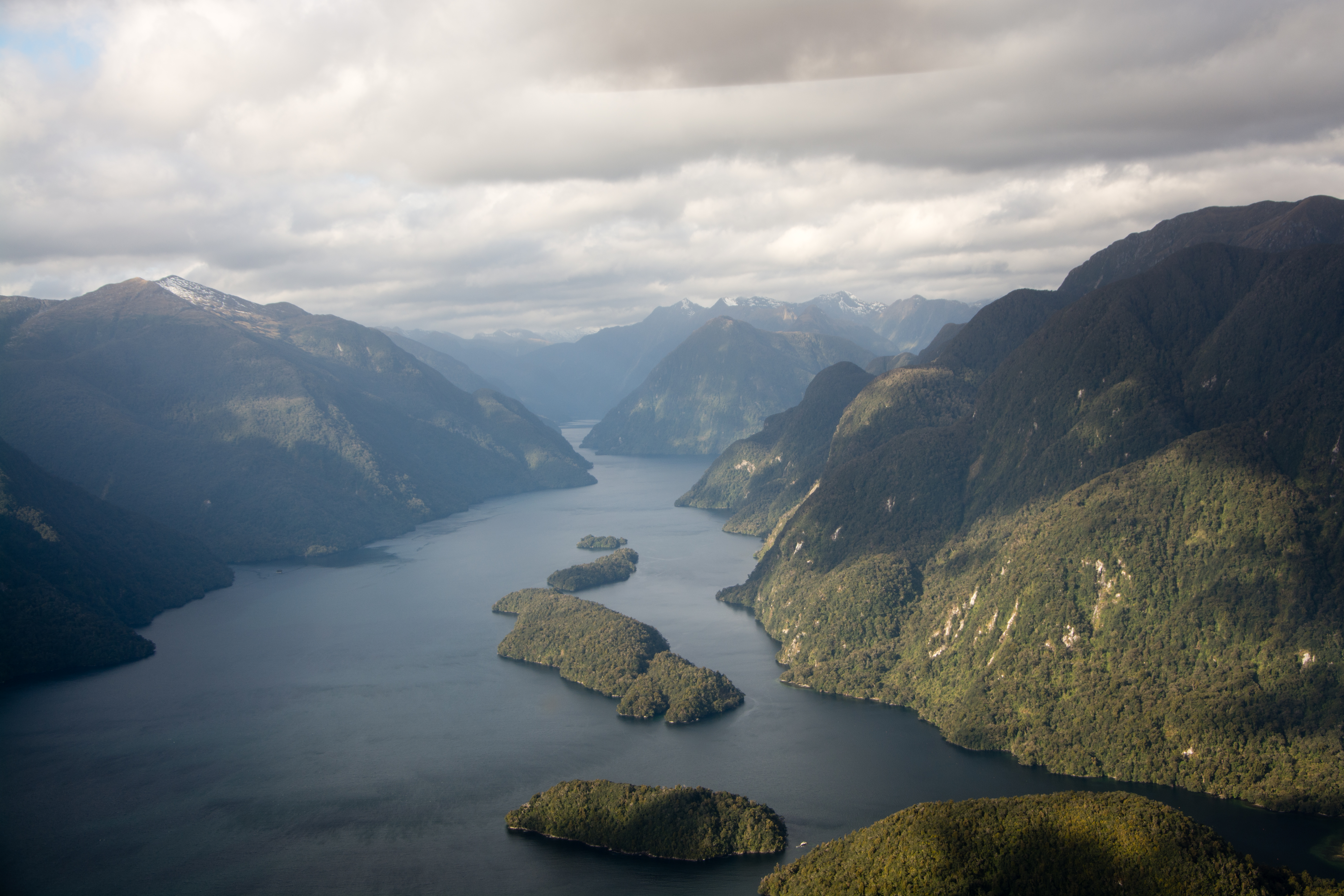
- Te Puaitaha / Breaksea Sound from the air

- Location in New Zealand Te Puaitaha / Breaksea Sound (New Zealand)
- Interactive map of Te Puaitaha / Breaksea Sound
- Location: Tasman Sea
- Coordinates: 45.57°S 166.78°E
- Basin countries: New Zealand
- Max. width: 1 km (0.62 mi)

Te Puaitaha / Breaksea Sound is a small fiord on the southwestern coast of South Island, New Zealand in the Tasman Sea. Breaksea Island in Fiordland National Park lies at its entrance. In the 1850s, early settlers Henry Hirst and John Watts-Russell explored the area for flat land suitable for sheep farming, but they were unsuccessful. In October 2019, the name of the fiord was officially altered to Te Puaitaha / Breaksea Sound.

== Gallery ==
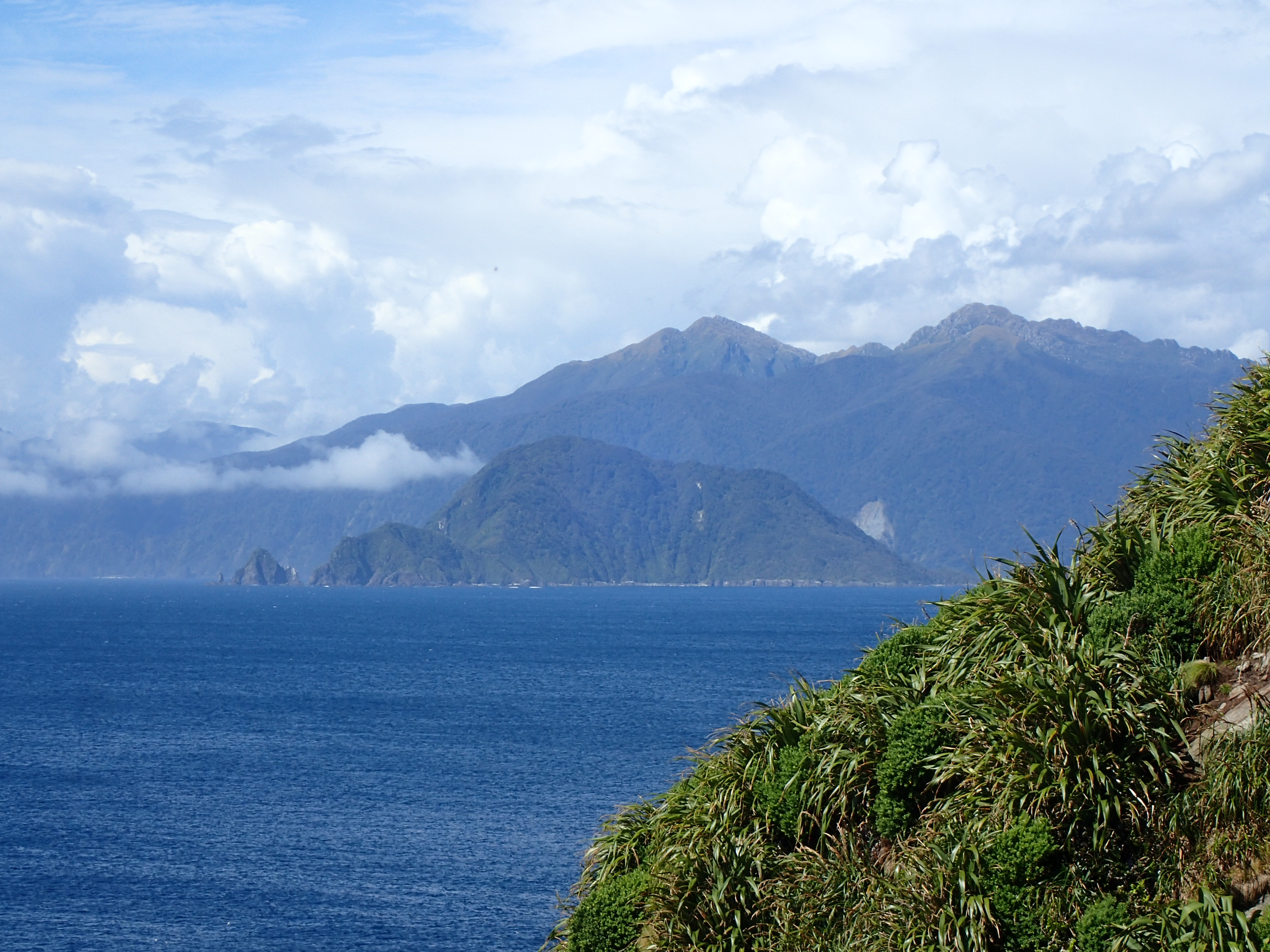
Breaksea Island at the entry to Te Puaitaha / Breaksea Sound.

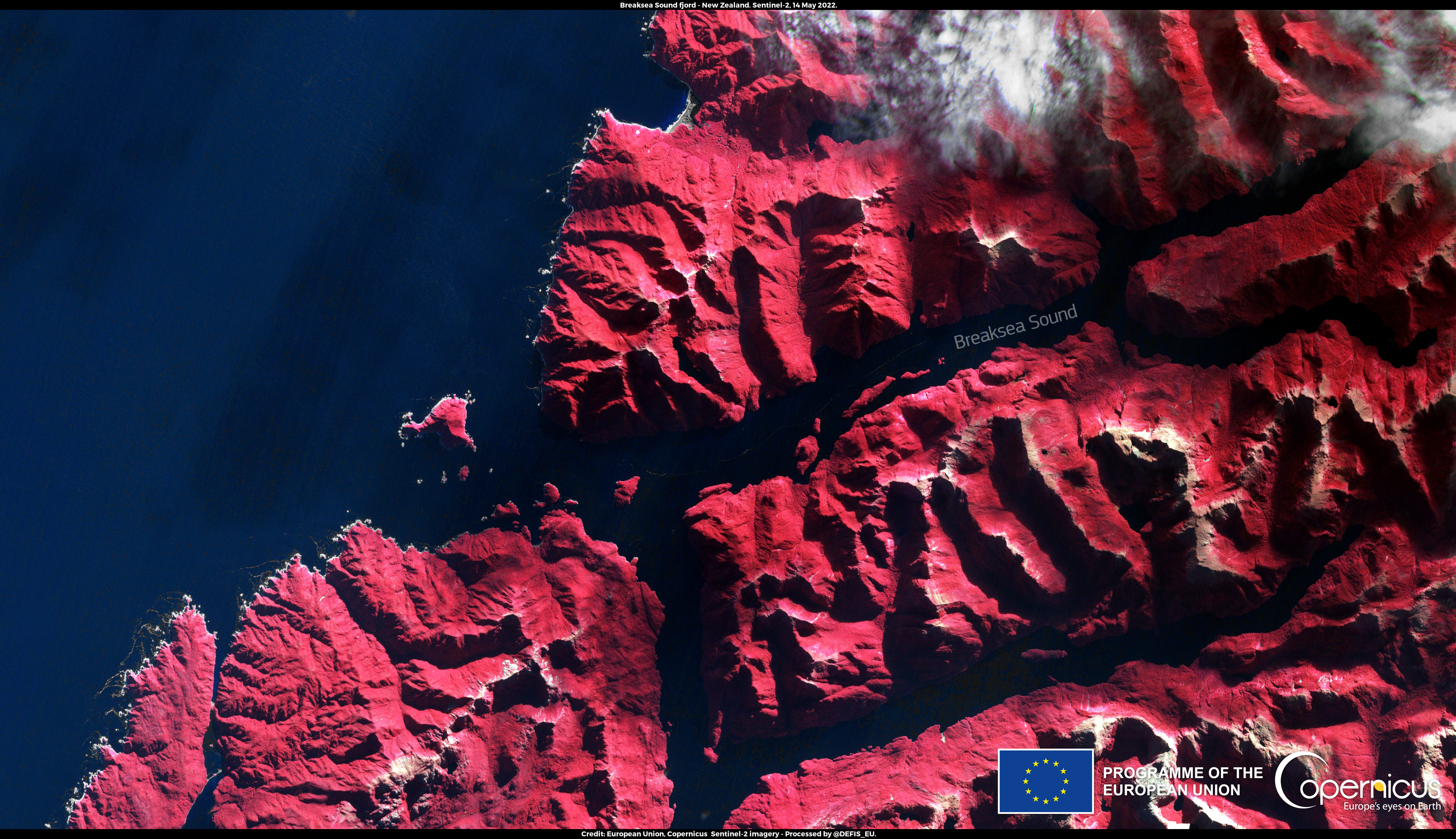
2022 satellite image of Te Puaitaha / Breaksea Sound, showing bleached sea sponges

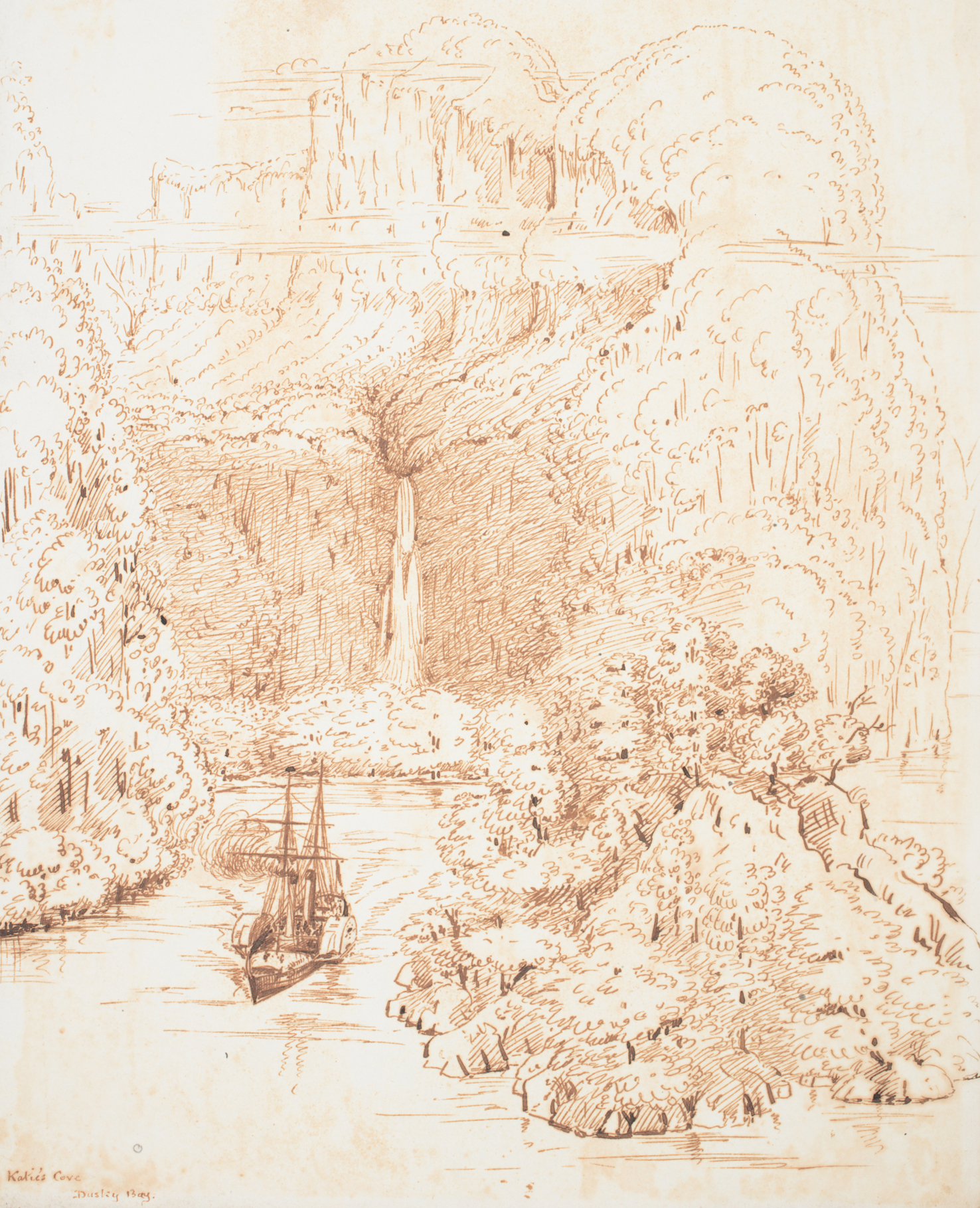
19th century sketch of the Narrows in Breaksea Sound by Charles Heaphy
