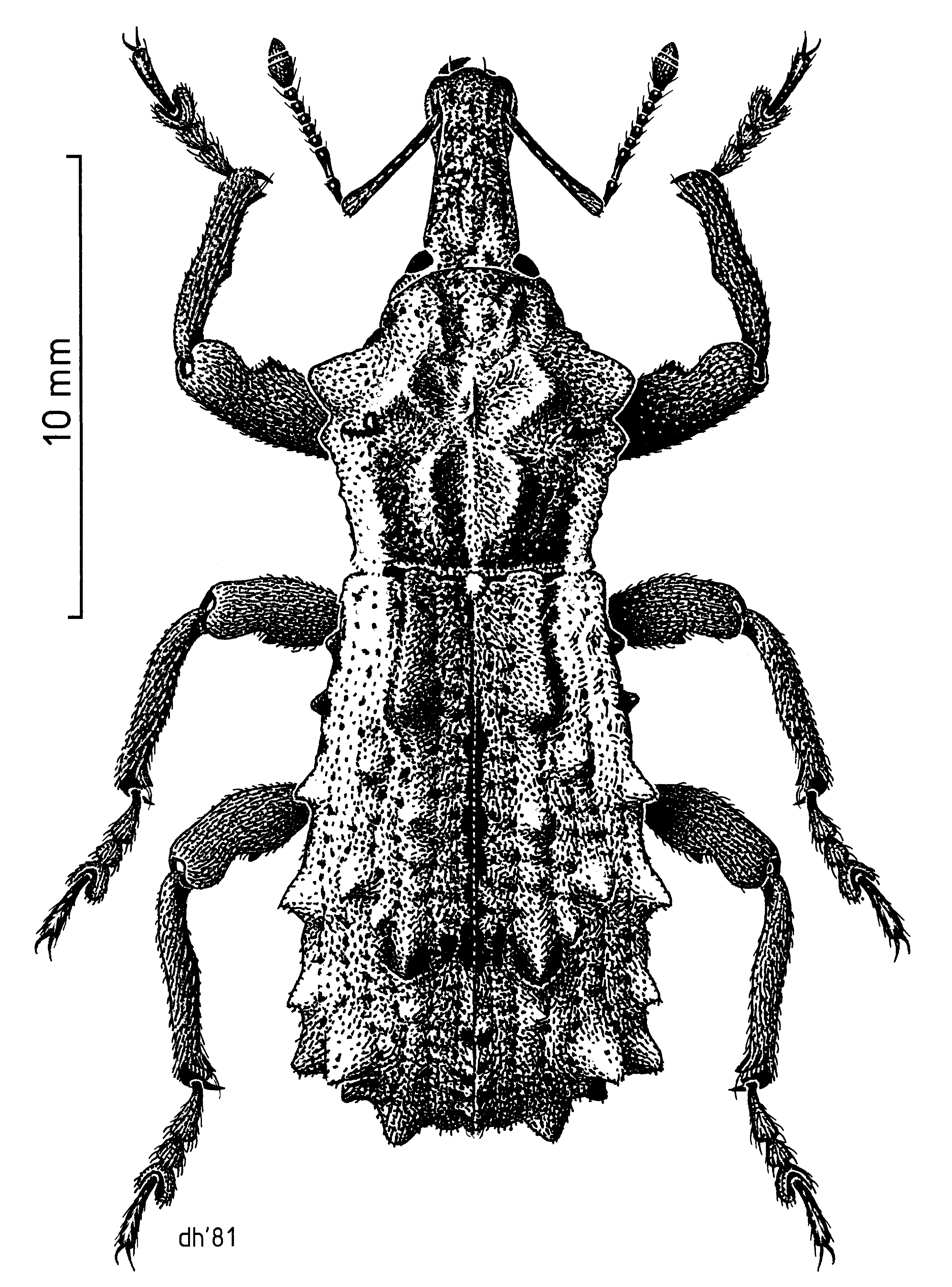

Conservation status
- Naturally Uncommon (NZ TCS)

Scientific classification
- Kingdom: Animalia
- Phylum: Arthropoda
- Class: Insecta
- Order: Coleoptera
- Suborder: Polyphaga
- Infraorder: Cucujiformia
- Family: Curculionidae
- Genus: Hadramphus
- Species: H. pittospori

Binomial name
- Hadramphus pittospori Kuschel, 1987

= Hadramphus pittospori =

Species of weevil

Hadramphus pittospori is a species of large molytine weevil in the family Curculionidae. It is endemic to the Poor Knights Islands of New Zealand. Under the New Zealand Threat Classification System, this species is listed as "Naturally Uncommon" with the qualifiers of "Island Endemic" and "Range Restricted".

== Taxonomy ==
This species was first described by Guillermo Kuschel as Karocolens pittospori in 1987. In 1999 it was redescribed by Robin Charles Craw and moved to genus Hadramphus.

The holotype specimen was found in the Poor Knights Islands and is stored in the New Zealand Arthropod Collection.

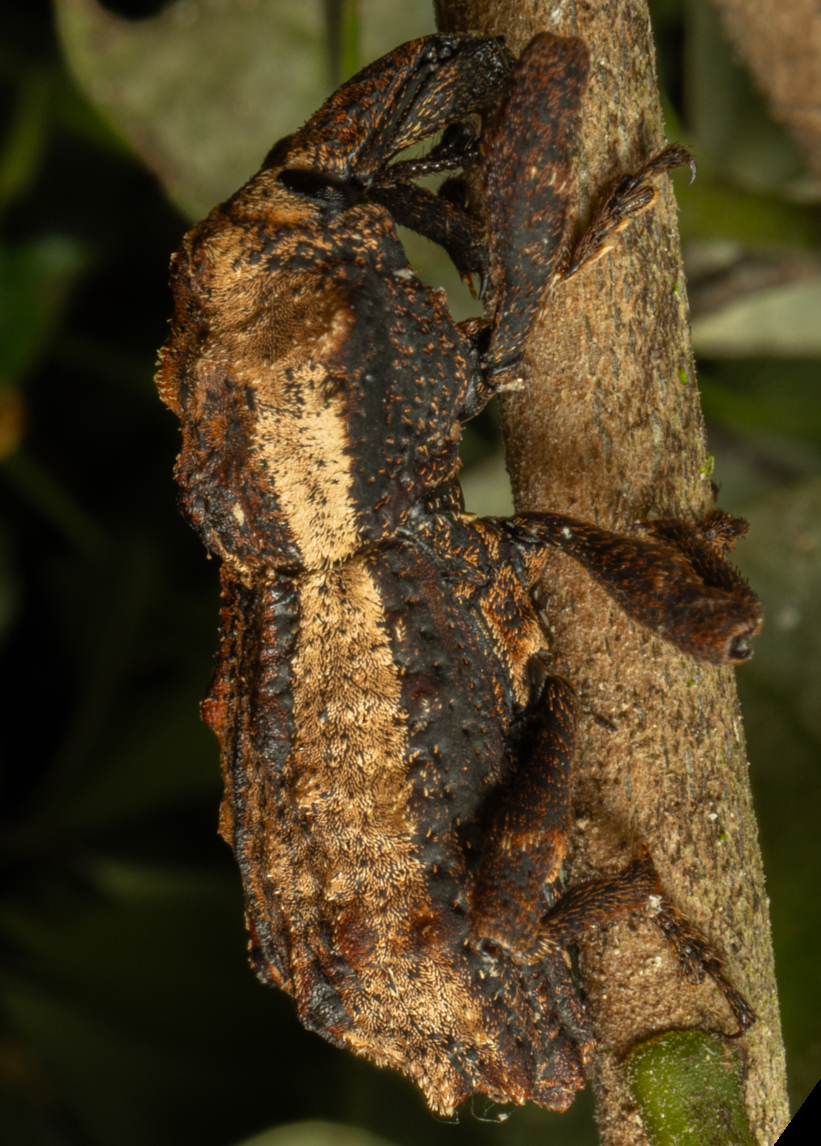

== Description ==
Both larvae and adults of Hadramphus pittospori are flightless and brown in colour. Adults are unusually long-lived for weevils and can survive for over 3 years when raised in captivity. They can reach lengths of 16.5-19.7 mm. The larvae can get up to 22 mm long. Larvae development consists of six instars, unlike most weevil species which have only three.

== Behaviour ==
The host plant of this species is karo (Pittosporum crassifolium). These weevils are likely nocturnal, based on field observations. The adults are active at night and are notably slow-moving in dark and cool environments, but appear to actively avoid direct hot sunlight.

== Distribution ==
Hadramphus pittospori is only found in the Poor Knights Islands of New Zealand.
