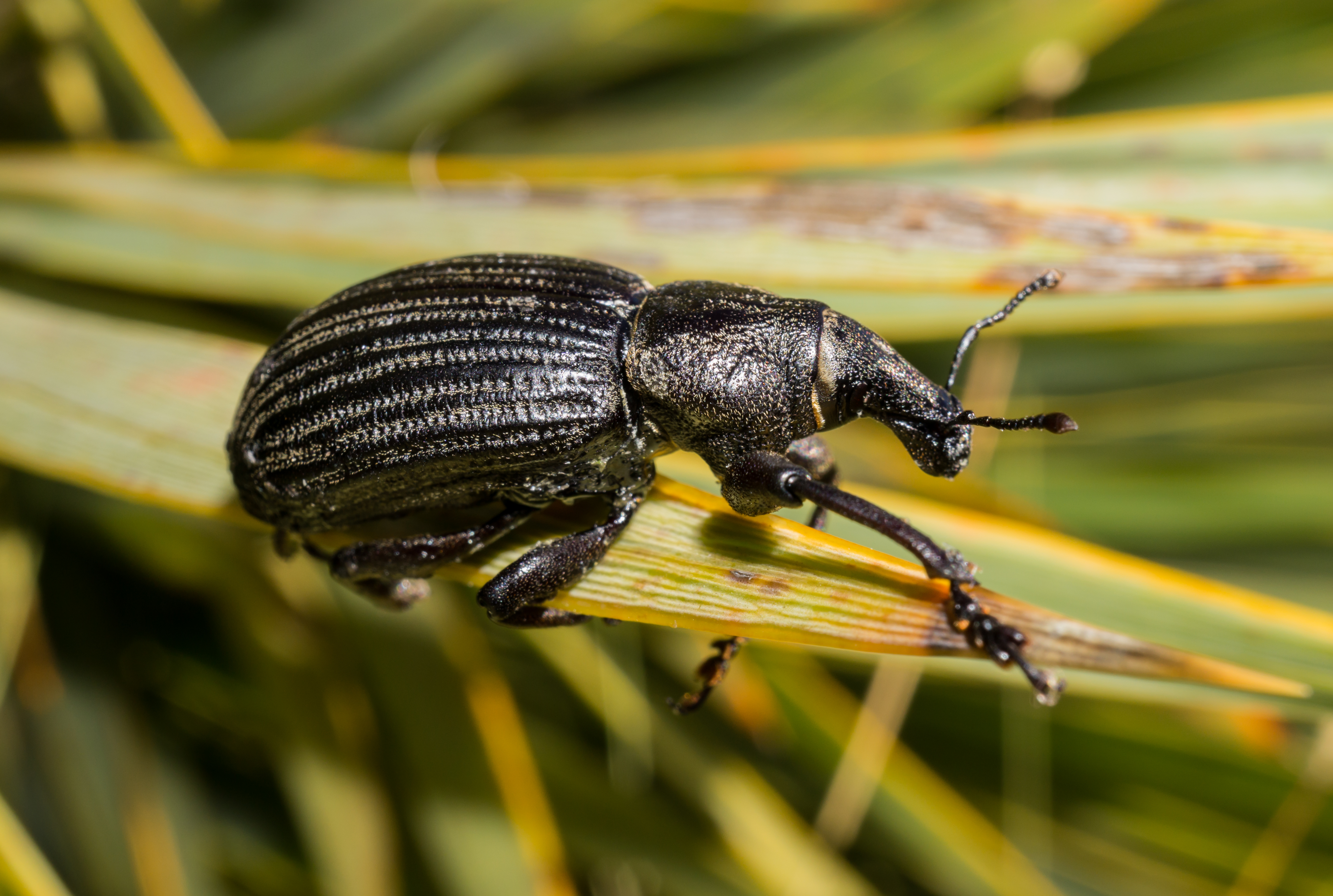
- A Lyperobius weevil on Aciphylla

Scientific classification
- Domain: Eukaryota
- Kingdom: Animalia
- Phylum: Arthropoda
- Class: Insecta
- Order: Coleoptera
- Suborder: Polyphaga
- Infraorder: Cucujiformia
- Family: Curculionidae
- Subfamily: Molytinae
- Genus: Lyperobius; Pascoe, 1876

= Lyperobius =

Genus of beetles

Lyperobius is a weevil genus in the subfamily Molytinae. Most Lyperobius species live in sub-alpine and alpine grassland, feeding on members of the family Apiaceae. Adults are active by day and feed on flowers, seeds, leaves and stems of the host plant. Larvae are found in the thick roots, rhizomes and soil surrounding the root system. All members of this genus are endemic to New Zealand. With the exception of L. huttoni and L. nesidiotes, all species are only found on the South Island.

== Species ==
Lyperobius australis - Lyperobius barbarae - Lyperobius carinatus - Lyperobius clarkei - Lyperobius coxalis - Lyperobius cupiendus - Lyperobius eylesi - Lyperobius fallax - Lyperobius glacialis - Lyperobius hudsoni - Lyperobius huttoni - Lyperobius montanus - Lyperobius nesidiotes - Lyperobius patricki - Lyperobius spedenii - Lyperobius townsendi
