= Christensenidrilus =

Scientific classification
- Domain: Eukaryota
- Kingdom: Animalia
- Phylum: Annelida
- Clade: Pleistoannelida
- Clade: Sedentaria
- Class: Clitellata
- Order: Tubificida
- Family: Enchytraeidae
- Genus: Christensenidrilus; Dózsa-Farkas & Convey, 1998

Synonyms
- Christensenia Dózsa-Farkas & Convey, 1997

Genus of annelid worms

Christensenidrilus is a genus of annelids belonging to the family Enchytraeidae.

Species:

- Christensenidrilus blocki (Dózsa-Farkas & Convey, 1997)
