= Breaksea Islands (Foveaux Strait) =

Islands in New Zealand

Geography
- Location: Foveaux Strait
- Coordinates: 46.790035°S 168.554416°E

Administration
- New Zealand
- Region: Southland

Demographics
- Population: uninhabited

The Breaksea Islands are a group of small islands in off the east coast of Ruapuke Island in the Foveaux Strait, New Zealand.

== See also ==
- List of islands of New Zealand
