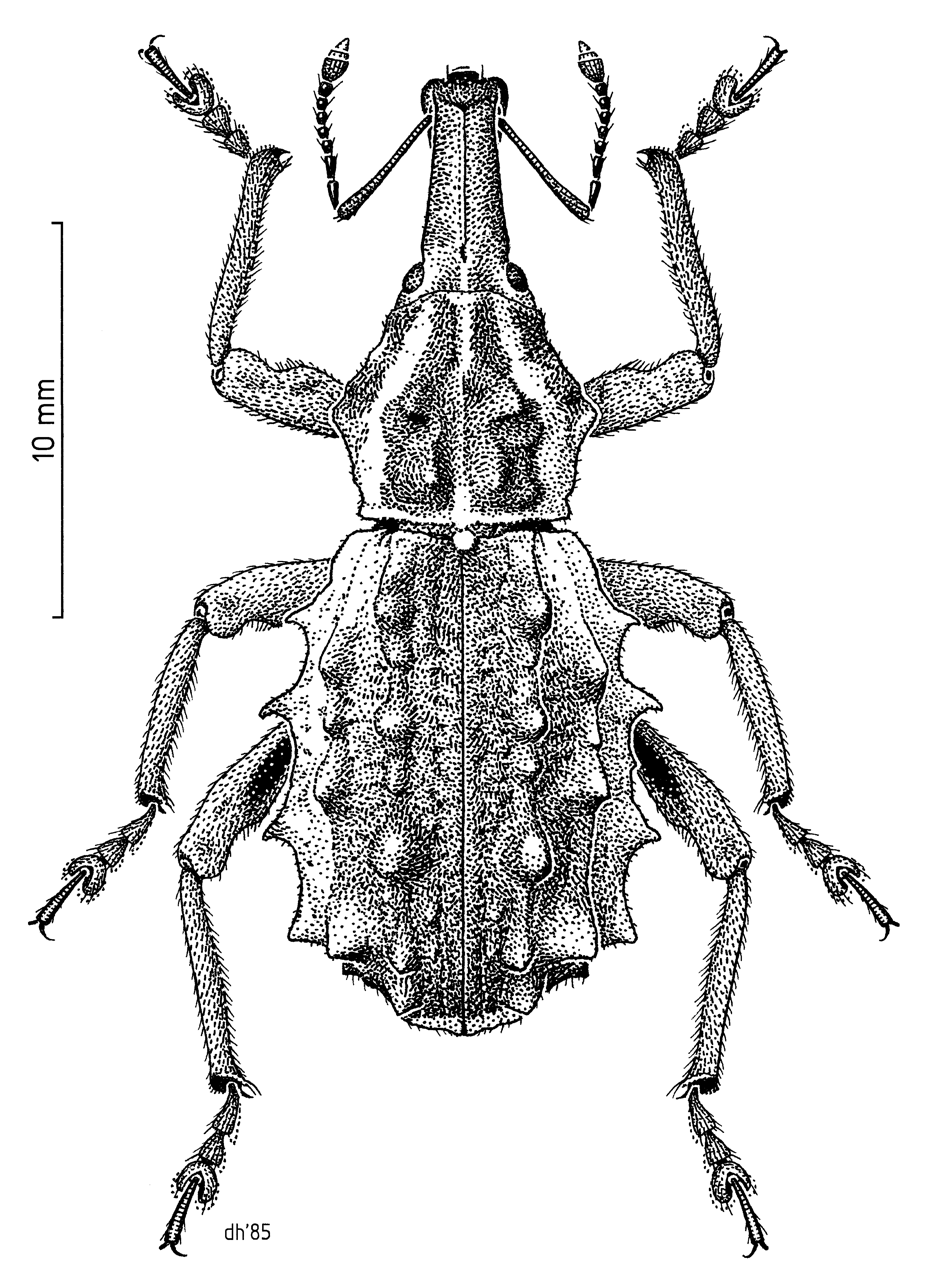
- Hadramphus spinipennis illustrated by Des Helmore

Conservation status
- Nationally Vulnerable (NZ TCS)

Scientific classification
- Kingdom: Animalia
- Phylum: Arthropoda
- Clade: Pancrustacea
- Class: Insecta
- Order: Coleoptera
- Suborder: Polyphaga
- Infraorder: Cucujiformia
- Superfamily: Curculionoidea
- Family: Curculionidae
- Genus: Hadramphus
- Species: H. spinipennis

Binomial name
- Hadramphus spinipennis Broun, 1911

= Hadramphus spinipennis =

Species of beetle

Hadramphus spinipennis, commonly called the coxella weevil, is a large, nocturnal, flightless weevil only found on Mangere and Rangatira Islands in the Chatham Islands, New Zealand.

== Description ==
Hadramphus spinipennis species was described by Thomas Broun as having a brown egg-shaped body with glossy brownish-black antennae. It has a prominent tubercle or wart-like projection on each side of its thorax and further tubercles on its abdomen, and a black underside. The length of the adult beetle ranges from 21–22 mm (females can reach 25 mm) excluding the rostrum, and its width is 10 mm. It is the only large weevil on the Chatham Islands.

This species was discovered by Thomas Hall, a sheep musterer on Pitt Island in the Chathams, who collected numerous specimens of undescribed species for Broun. Despite being described from Pitt Island, it has not been seen there since Hall discovered it, probably because its host plant there has been almost wiped out by sheep. It is one of four Hadramphus weevil species, all endemic to New Zealand, specialised, flightless, and rare.

== Ecology ==
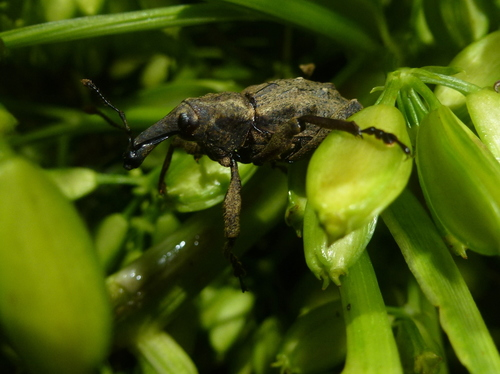
Coxella weevil on Mangere Island

This weevil's host plant is Aciphylla dieffenbachii Kirk (coxella or Dieffenbach's speargrass), a soft-leaved relative of the spine-bearing alpine Aciphylla of the New Zealand mainland. Adults make a characteristic oval feeding notch on the leaf petiole, sometimes scraping away the leaf to encourage to production of gum. Green seeds and flowers of coxella are eaten, with a preference for male flowers. Leaves are also gummed together to shelter a feeding larva, but larve also feed in the crown of the plant amongst leaf bases, and if several are present they can kill the plant.

Because they sometimes kill their host plants, adult weevils are able to walk considerable distances—up to 600 m—in search of new patches of coxella. They seem to form a metapopulation, relying on the constant re-establishment of new patches of Aciphylla after old patches are wiped out by high weevil densities. Coxella weevils are also regularly found on Chatham Island lancewood (Pseudopanax chathamicum), on which they seem to shelter but only intermittently eat.

== Life cycle ==
Adult weevils are gregarious, and congregate in reasonable numbers on coxella flower heads on warm, humid nights. Reproduction involves copulation between the months of September to March, generally on male flowers. This is followed by burying of single eggs in the soil underneath the host plant from September to April or May. Larvae develop by feeding on the root parenchyma, and pupate into adult weevils in chambers up to 600 mm below the soil surface. Adult coxella weevils live from a few months to four years.

== Conservation ==
This species is only found on the two small predator-free islands of Mangere and Rangatira; it may exist on other smaller rock stacks that have coxella. Its host plant, A. dieffenbachii, is similarly rare, mostly found on Mangere, though some exists on Rangatira, and those parts of Pitt and main Chatham Island where livestock have not eaten it.

Because it has such a small range and is dependent on a single host plant species, H. spinipennis is classified as Nationally Vulnerable by the Department of Conservation. With only two known populations, conservation of H. spinipennis will depend on establishing a third population, by creating Aciphylla patches in an area free of livestock and ideally without cats, mice, or weka.
