= Breaksea Islands (Stewart Island) =

Islands in New Zealand

Geography
- Location: Stewart Island
- Coordinates: 47.110658°S 168.204828°E

Administration
- New Zealand
- Region: Southland

Demographics
- Population: uninhabited

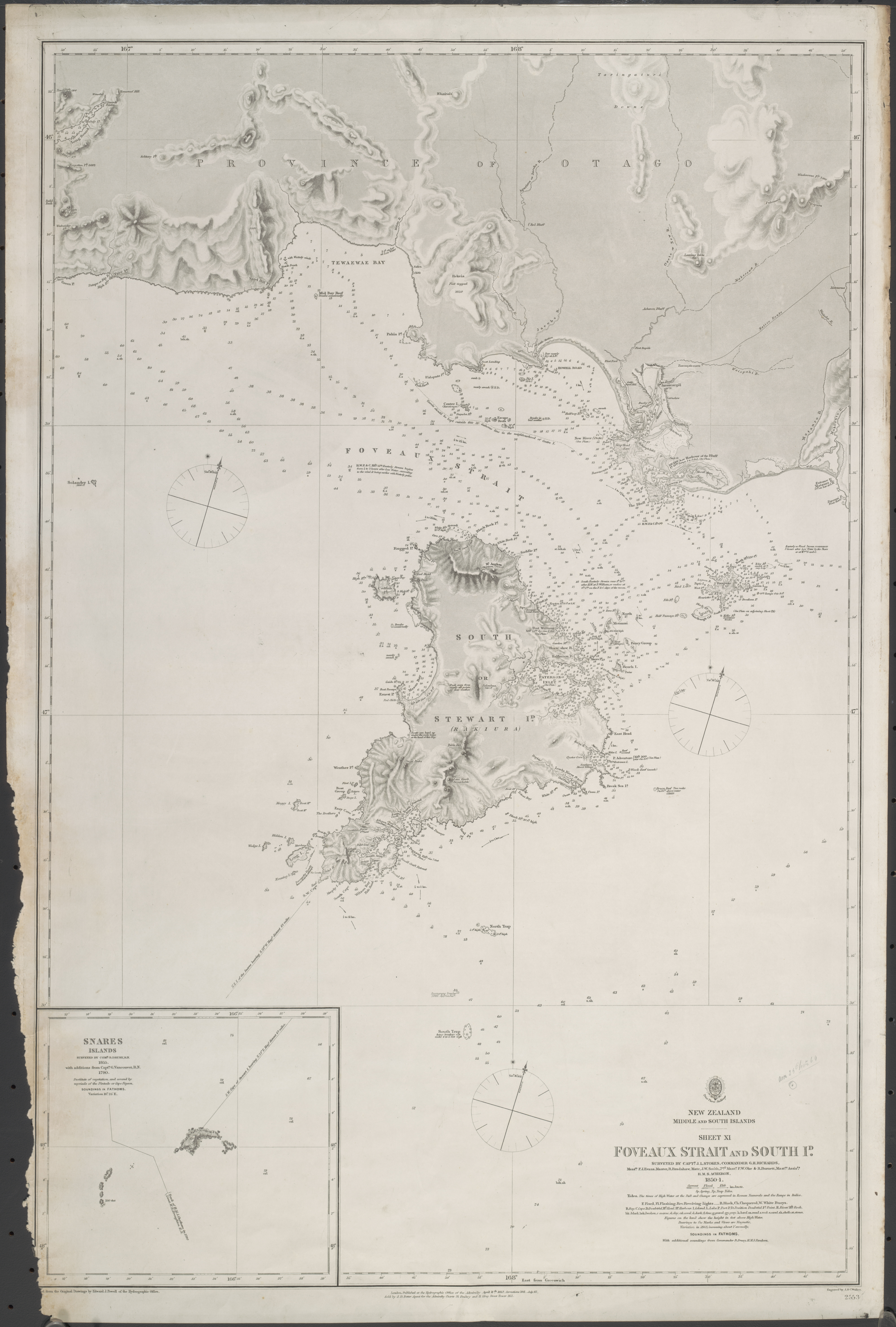
Break Sea Islands in the Foveaux Strait

The Breaksea Islands are a group of islands off the east coast of Stewart Island, New Zealand. They are to the south of the Tītī / Muttonbird Islands. The islands include Pomatakiarehua, Kiahuka, and Wharepuaitaha island. The largest island in the group is Joss Island.

== See also ==
- List of islands of New Zealand
