= Breaksea Island (Fiordland) =

Island in Fiordland, New Zealand

Kā Huruhuru-o-koekoeā
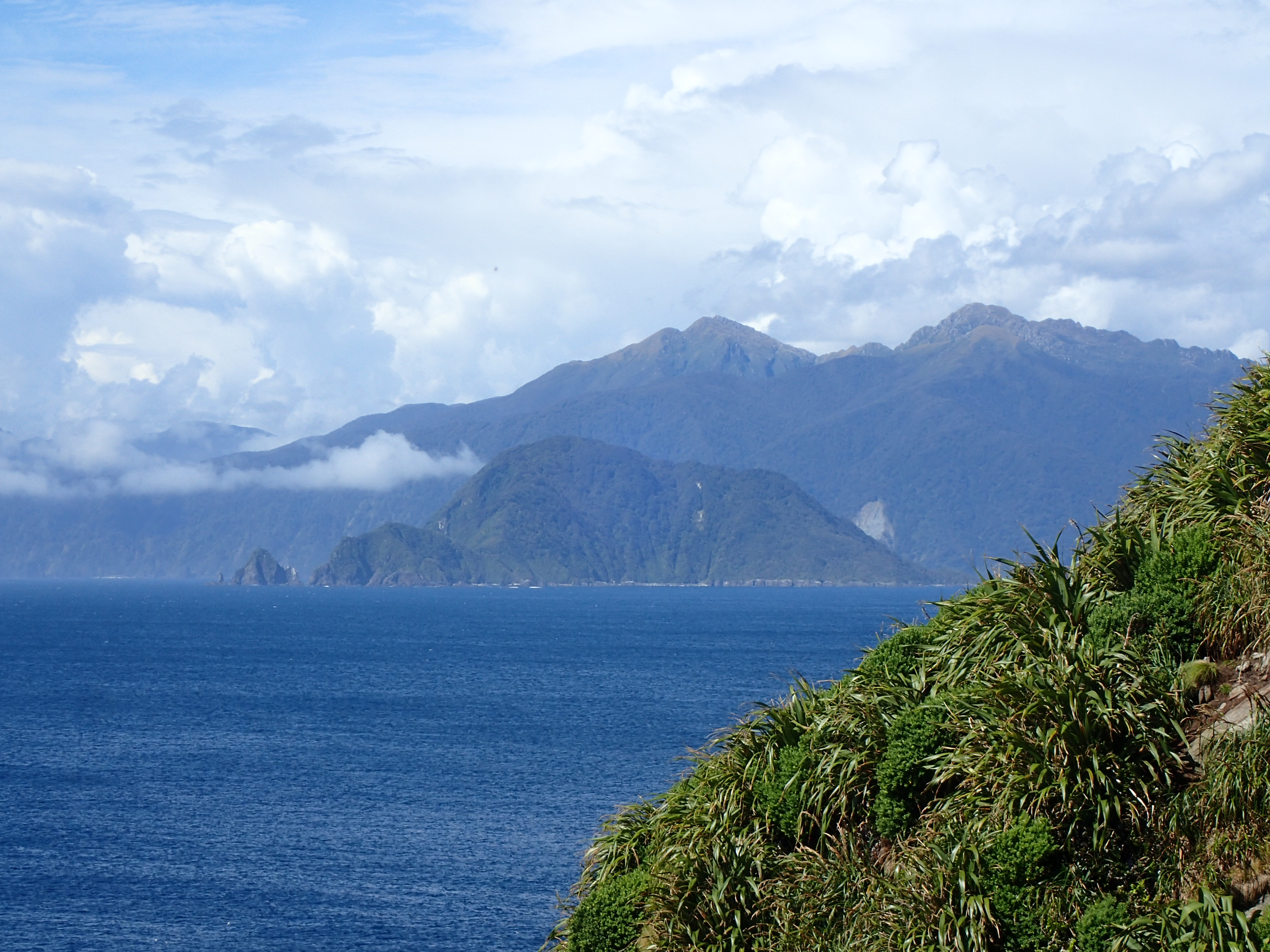
- Breaksea Island (center) - from the South-West.

- Location within New Zealand

Geography
- Location: Fiordland National Park
- Coordinates: 45°34′45″S 166°38′14″E
- Area: 1.56 km^{2} (0.60 sq mi)
- Highest elevation: 350 m (1150 ft)

Administration
- New Zealand

Demographics
- Population: 0

Breaksea Island is a rugged 1.6 km^{2} (1 sq mi) island in the southwest of New Zealand, and is part of Fiordland National Park. Its highest point is 350 m (1,148 ft) asl and it lies about 2 km (1.2 mi) from the mainland in the entrance to Te Puaitaha / Breaksea Sound, north of the much larger Resolution Island. It is covered in temperate rainforest and was the site of one of the first successful campaigns to eradicate rats from a sizeable island.

== Rat eradication ==
The pioneering eradication of brown rats, using brodifacoum in poison baits, was carried out by the New Zealand Department of Conservation (DOC) in May and June 1988 following the success of a pilot campaign on the adjacent, and much smaller (9 ha or 22 acres), Hāwea Island in 1986. At the time, Breaksea was six times the size of the previous largest island on which rat eradication had been successful. Since then, DOC has overseen the eradication of a suite of introduced animals from several other islands, the largest being Campbell Island / Motu Ihupuku at 113 km^{2} (44 sq mi).

== Fauna ==
Fiordland crested penguins breed on Breaksea. Since rat eradication various threatened species of New Zealand's native fauna have been introduced, or reintroduced, there. These include the tieke (saddleback), mōhua (yellowhead), Fiordland skink and knobbled weevils.

Fauna of Fiordland Island
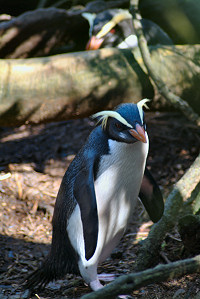
Fiordland Penguin (Eudyptes pachyrhynchus)

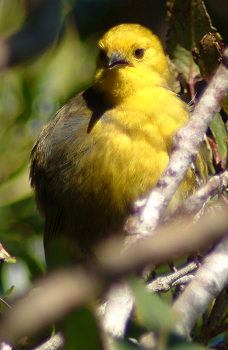
Yellowhead (Mohoua ochrocephala)

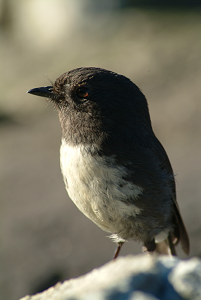
New Zealand South Island Robin (Petroica australis australis)

== See also ==
- List of islands of New Zealand
- List of islands
- Desert island
