= Guillermo Kuschel =

Chilean New Zealand lecturer and entomologist

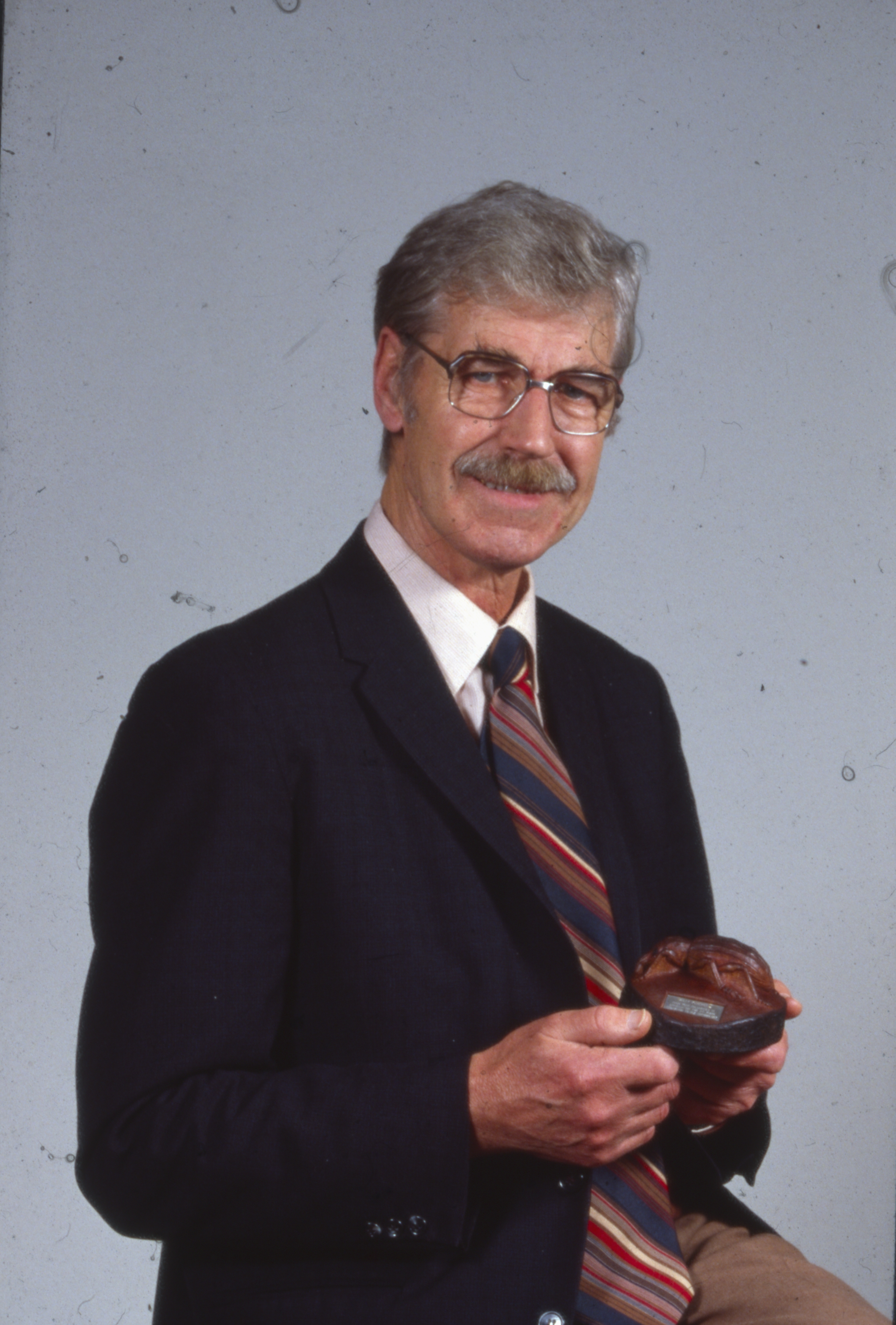
- Willy Kuschel on his 65th birthday
- Born: 13 July 1918; Frutillar, Chile
- Died: 1 August 2017 (aged 99); Auckland, New Zealand
- Education: University of Chile
- Spouse: Beverley Holloway (m. 1963)
- Scientific career
- Fields: Entomology
- Workplaces: University of Chile; Department of Scientific and Industrial Research

Guillermo Kuschel (13 July 1918 – 1 August 2017) was a Chilean-New Zealander entomologist who made significant contributions to the study of weevils. After studies in philosophy and theology, he attained a PhD in biological sciences from the University of Chile for work on the genus Lissorhoptrus. He became the head of the university's Entomology Department in 1957, as well as conducting significant field work, including to the Juan Fernandez Islands.

In 1961, he met taxonomist Beverley Anne Holloway during a visit to New Zealand, and the couple married in 1963 after he began working with the Department of Scientific and Industrial Research in Nelson. He continued his field work, including the 1970 Three Kings Islands expedition, and he was a major collector for the New Zealand Arthropod Collection. In 1971 Kuschel erected the monospecific beetle genus Palirhoeus, found on the Islands of sub-antarctic Indian Ocean.

Kuschel became a naturalised New Zealand citizen in 1969.
