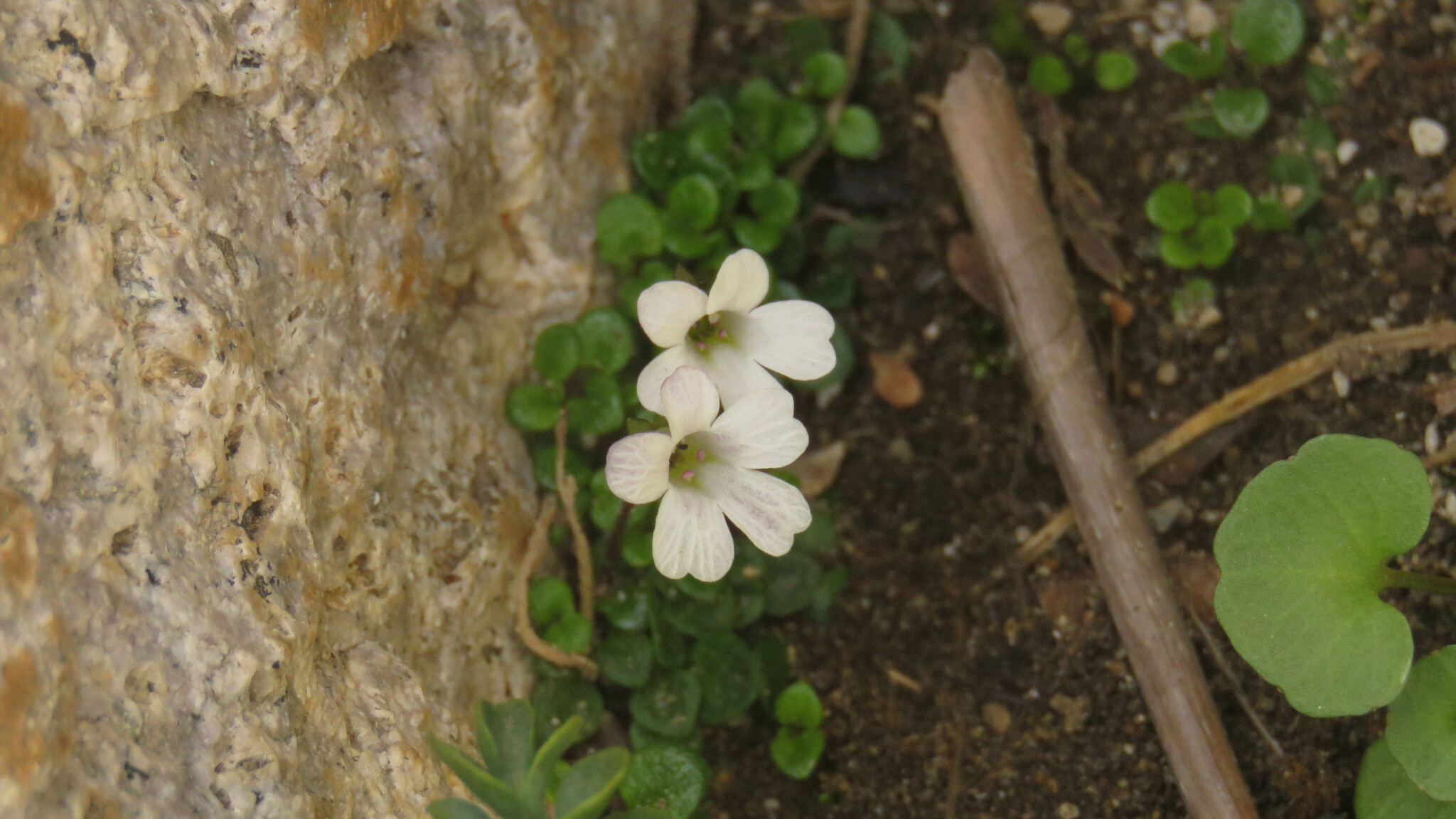
- Flowering plant of Ourisia pygmaea from Bariloche, Argentina

Scientific classification
- Kingdom: Plantae
- Clade: Tracheophytes
- Clade: Angiosperms
- Clade: Eudicots
- Clade: Asterids
- Order: Lamiales
- Family: Plantaginaceae
- Genus: Ourisia
- Species: O. pygmaea

Binomial name
- Ourisia pygmaea Phil.

= Ourisia pygmaea =

Subspecies of flowering plant

Ourisia pygmaea is a species of flowering plant in the family Plantaginaceae that is endemic to mountainous habitats of the Andes of southern Argentina and Chile. German-Chilean botanist Rodolfo Amando Philippi described O. pygmaea in 1858. Plants of this species are very small, with solitary white bilabiate corollas that are glabrous (hairless) inside the corolla tube, a regular calyx with 5 ciliate lobes divided to the base, glabrous leaves, and a creeping habit.

== Taxonomy ==
Ourisia pygmaea is in the plant family Plantaginaceae. German-Chilean botanist Rodolfo Amando Philippi described O. pygmaea in 1858 based on specimens collected by another German-Chilean naturalist, Francisco Fonck. The type locality of O. pygmaea is in the Chilean region of Los Lagos at "Cerro del Doce de Febrero" (which is today known as the Pérez Rosales international mountain pass). The holotype and an isotype are housed at the Chilean National Museum of Natural History in Santiago (herbarium SGO) (SGO 056379, SGO 043059) and an isotype is also at the Academy of Natural Sciences of Drexel University (herbarium PH).

The species epithet "pygmaea" refers to the small size of this species. Together with O. fuegiana from the southern Andes, O. modesta from New Zealand, O. muscosa and O. biflora from the northern Andes, Ourisia pygmaea is one of the smallest species of Ourisia. It also resembles O. cotapatensis from the northern Andes, but can be distinguished from that species by its white flowers and longer glabrous pedicels, among other characteristics.

Ourisia pygmaea is morphologically most similar to two other southern Andean species, O. fuegiana and O. breviflora. Plants of these three species have bilabiate corollas, and have plant parts that are either not hairy (glabrous) or have non-glandular hairs only.

Compared to O. fuegiana, O. pygmaea has glabrous leaves and petioles, sessile floral bracts, spreading corolla lobes, and longer styles >2.5 mm (vs. hairy leaves and petioles, petiolate floral bracts, corolla lobes that are not spreading, and short styles <1.6 mm long in O. fuegiana). O. pygmaea can be distinguished from O. breviflora by its white corollas; entire, sessile and small (<3.6 mm long) floral bracts; glabrous petioles (vs. pink or lilac corollas; toothed, petiolate and larger (>3.0 mm long) floral bracts; and hairy petioles in O. breviflora).

The geographic distribution of O. pygmaea (37°S to 45°S) does not overlap with that of O. fuegiana (46°S to 56°S), barely overlaps with that of O. breviflora subsp. breviflora (44°S to 56°S), and almost completely overlaps with the geographic range of O. breviflora subsp. uniflora (37°S to 44°S).

== Description ==
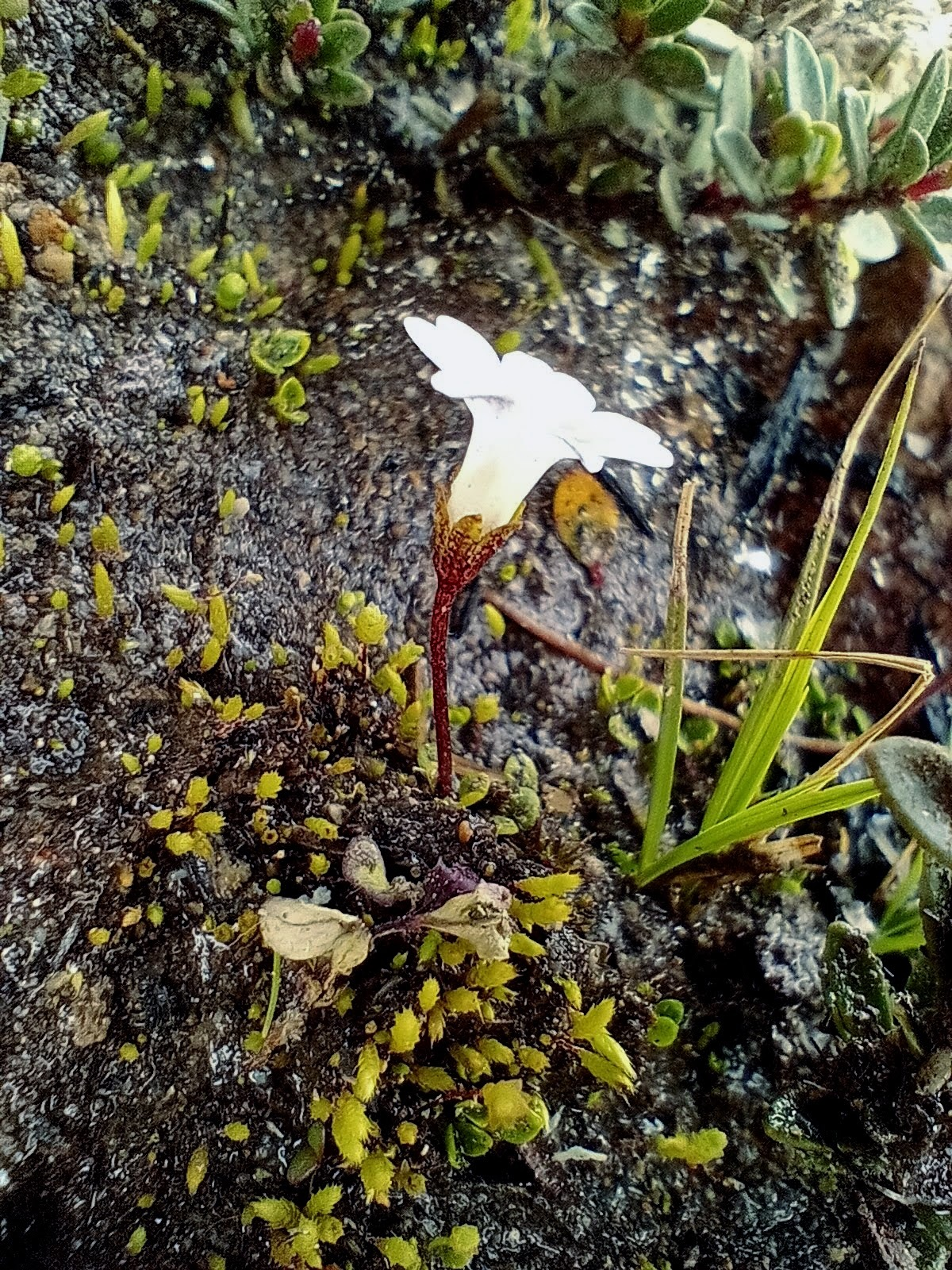
Tiny flowering plant of O. pygmaea in damp habitat of Bariloche, Argentina

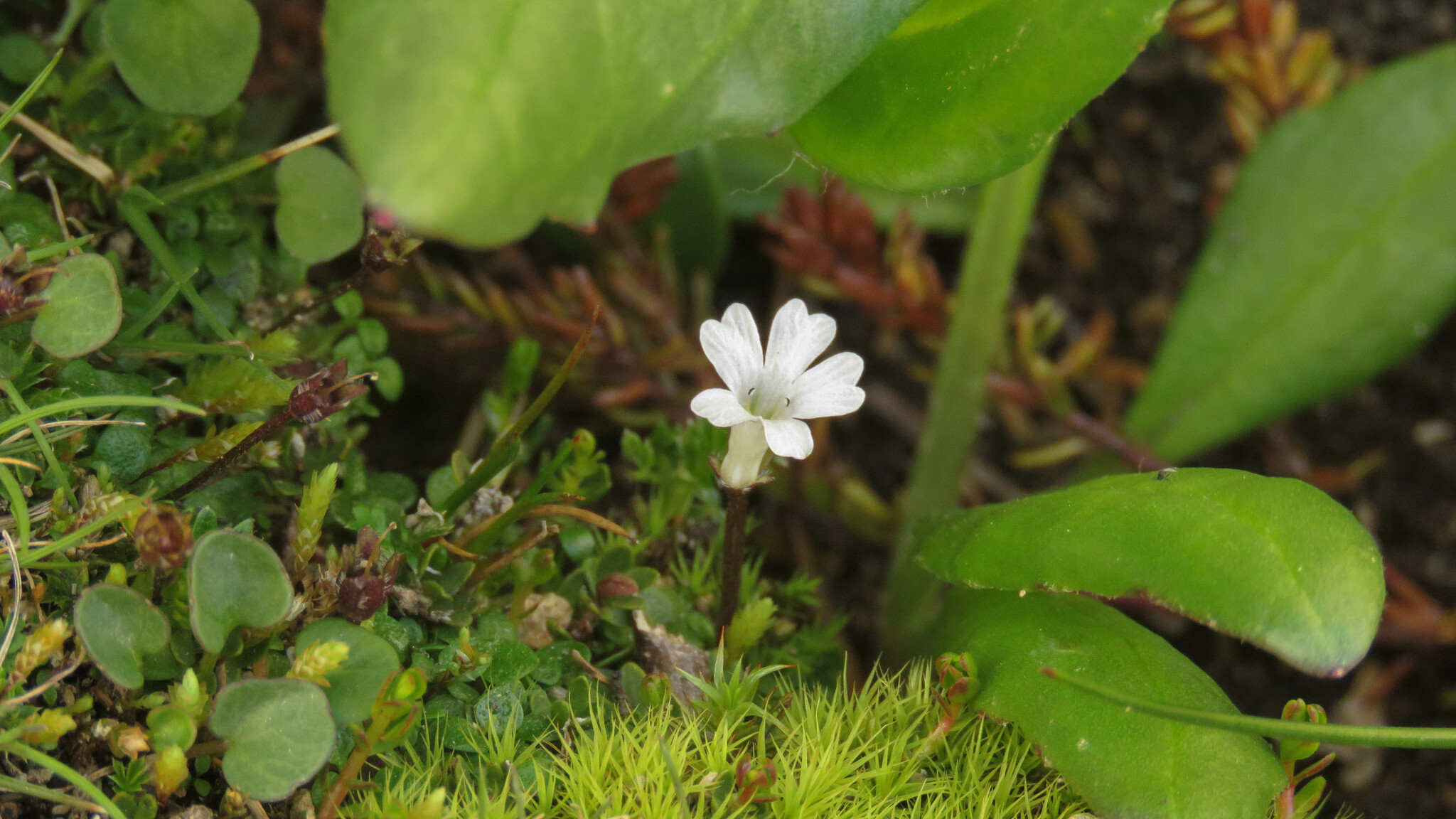
Flowering plant of O. pygmaea with other native plants including mosses

Ourisia pygmaea plants are perennial, repent, herbs. The short stems are 0.4–0.8 mm wide, and glabrous (hairless). Leaves are opposite, tightly clustered, petiolate, 1.4–5.3 mm long by 1.3–4.8 mm wide (length: width ratio 0.9–1.2:1). Leaf petioles are 1.3–6.4 mm long and usually glabrous or with a few short non-glandular hairs. Leaf blades are broadly ovate or very broadly ovate, widest below the middle, with a rounded apex, cuneate or truncate base, and smooth or shallowly-notched edges. The upper surface of the leaf is usually glabrous or with a few short non-glandular hairs, and the lower surface is glabrous and punctate. Inflorescences are erect, up to 38 mm long, with a solitary flower, and each plant has usually 1–3 inflorescences. Each flower has up to 2 bracts that are lanceolate or narrowly ovate. The bracts are similar to the leaves but smaller, 2.3–3.5 mm long and 0.8–1.6 mm wide and sessile. The flowers are borne on a pedicel that is up to 25.4 mm long and glabrous, or sometimes with a few short non-glandular or glandular hairs. The calyx is 3.2–4.2 mm long, regular, with all 5 lobes equally divided to the base of the calyx, usually glabrous. The corolla is 8.3–11.5 mm long (including a 4.2–6.7 mm long corolla tube), bilabiate, straight, tubular-funnelform, white, and glabrous inside and outside. The corolla lobes are 2.0–4.5 mm long, spreading, obcordate or obovate and deeply emarginate. There are 4 stamens which are didynamous, with both the two long stamens and the two short stamens included or reaching the corolla tube opening. The style is 2.5–4.0 mm long, included, with an emarginate or capitate stigma. The ovary is 1.0–2.0 mm long. Fruits are glabrous capsules with loculicidal dehiscence, and fruiting pedicels are 18.0–22.0 mm long. The number of seeds in each capsule is unknown, and seeds are about 0.6 mm long and 0.3 mm wide, elliptic, with a weakly two-layered (or one layered), reticulate (having a net-like pattern) seed coat with thick, smooth, shallow, primary reticula.

Ourisia pygmaea flowers from December to March and fruits in February and March.

The chromosome number of Ourisia pygmaea is unknown.

== Distribution and habitat ==
Ourisia pygmaea is endemic to the Andes mountains of southern Argentina and Chile from approximately 37°S to 45°S latitude. It is found in the Argentinean provinces of Neuquén, Río Negro and Chubut, including some national parks, and the Chilean regions of Biobío, Los Ríos, Los Lagos and Araucanía. It can be found from 900 to 2500 m above sea level in wet or rocky habitats, often near running water, sometimes with mosses and sedges or below the tree line in Nothofagus forest.

== Phylogeny ==
One individual of O. pygmaea was included in a phylogenetic analysis of all species of the genus Ourisia, using standard DNA sequencing markers (two nuclear ribosomal DNA markers and two chloroplast DNA regions) and morphological data. Ourisia pygmaea was placed with high support in a clade of southern Andean herbaceous species, but its position in that clade was unresolved.
