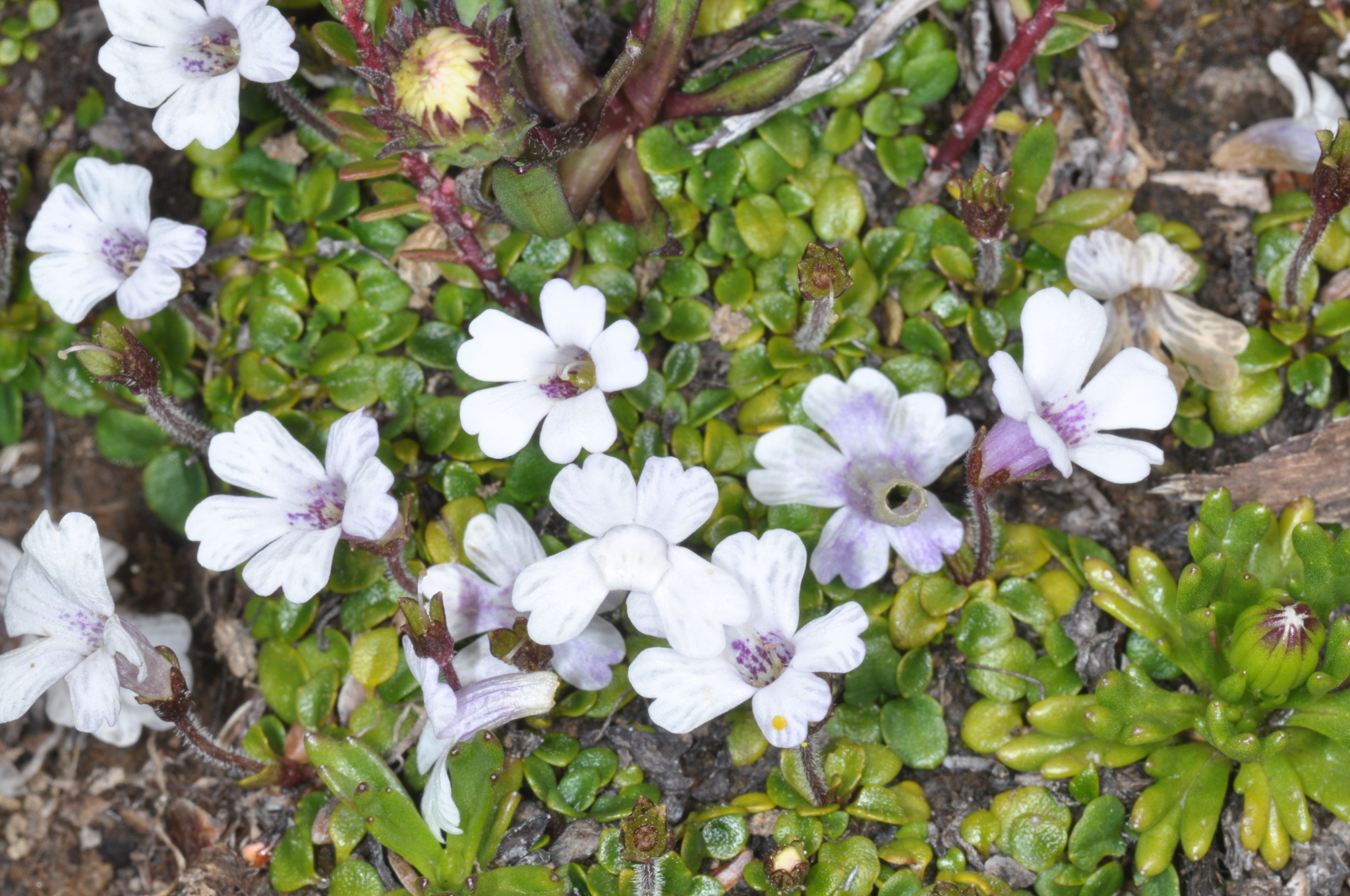
- Flowering plant of Ourisia breviflora subsp. uniflora from Bariloche, Argentina

Scientific classification
- Kingdom: Plantae
- Clade: Tracheophytes
- Clade: Angiosperms
- Clade: Eudicots
- Clade: Asterids
- Order: Lamiales
- Family: Plantaginaceae
- Genus: Ourisia
- Species: O. breviflora
- Subspecies: O. b. subsp. uniflora

Trinomial name
- Ourisia breviflora subsp. uniflora (Phil.) Meudt

Synonyms
- Ourisia uniflora Phil.; Ourisia breviflora var. uniflora Reiche

= Ourisia breviflora subsp. uniflora =

Subspecies of flowering plant

Ourisia breviflora subsp. uniflora is a subspecies of flowering plant in the family Plantaginaceae that is endemic to mountainous habitats of the Andes of southern Chile and Argentina. Rodolfo Amando Philippi described O. uniflora in 1858, which is now recognised as a subspecies of O. breviflora. Plants of this subspecies are found in the northern part of the range of O. breviflora in the Andes of southern Chile and Argentina from 37–44°S latitude. They have usually glabrous (hairless) leaves, no dark purple veins on the corollas, and floral bracts up to 5 mm long.

== Taxonomy ==
Ourisia breviflora subsp. uniflora is in the plant family Plantaginaceae. Rodolfo Amando Philippi described O. uniflora in 1858. Later, in 1911, German-Chilean botanist Karl Friedrich Reiche treated O. uniflora as a variety of O. breviflora, and most recently it has been recognised at the subspecies level.

German-Chilean naturalist Francisco Fonck collected the type material of O. uniflora in the Chilean region of Los Lagos at "Cerro del Doce de Febrero" (which is today known as the Pérez Rosales international mountain pass). The holotype is housed at the Chilean National Museum of Natural History in Santiago (herbarium SGO) (SGO 056401).

Ourisia breviflora subsp. uniflora is one of two allopatric subspecies of O. breviflora. It is distributed in the northern part of the range of O. breviflora in Chile and Argentina, from 37–44°S latitude, whereas O. breviflora subsp. breviflora is found in further south from 44–55°S latitude.

Ourisia breviflora subsp. uniflora can be distinguished from subsp. breviflora by its usually glabrous (hairless) leaves, lack of dark purple veins on the corollas, and floral bracts up to 5 mm long. These characters contrast with the long, sparsely to densely distributed hairs on the upper surface of the leaves, corollas that have dark purple striations, and floral bracts more than 5 mm long of O. breviflora subsp. breviflora.

== Description ==
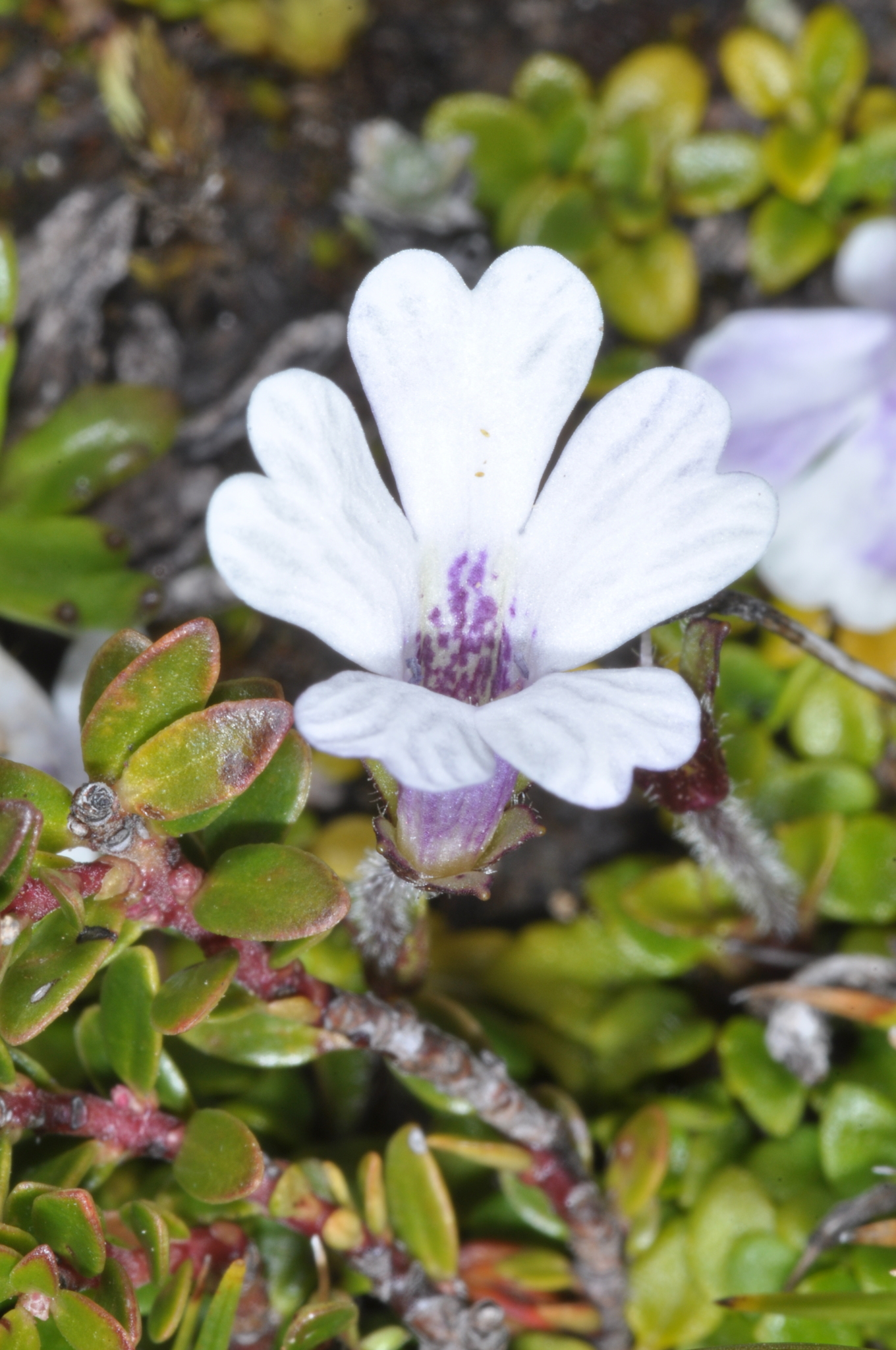
Corolla

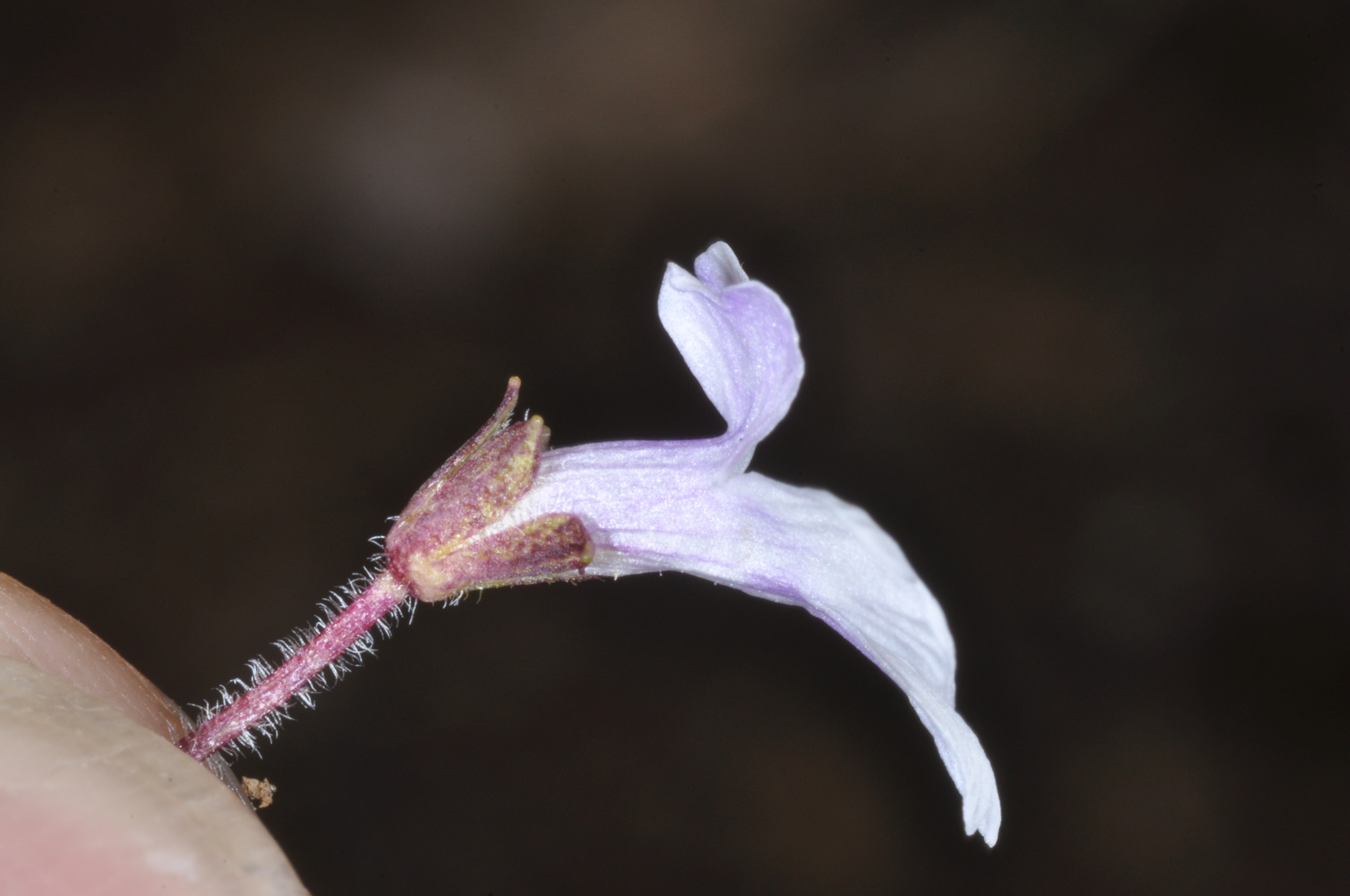
Corolla, side view

Ourisia breviflora subsp. uniflora plants are perennial, erect, rosette herbs. The short stems are 0.7–1.6 mm wide, and glabrous (hairless) or hairy with short or long, non-glandular hairs. Leaves are opposite or tightly clustered in a subrosette, petiolate, 3.0–5.1 mm long by 1.1–3.7 mm wide (length: width ratio 0.9–1.2:1). Leaf petioles are 1.6–15.1 mm long and sparsely to densely hairy with short or long non-glandular hairs. Leaf blades are ovate, broadly ovate, or very broadly ovate, widest below the middle, with a rounded apex, cordate, truncate or cuneate base, and crenate edges. The upper surface of the leaf is usually glabrous (rarely with a few nonglandular hairs) and the lower surface is also punctate. Inflorescences are erect, with hairy racemes up to 12 cm long, and with 1–2 flowering nodes and up to 5 total flowers per raceme. Each flowering node has 1–2 flowers and 2 bracts that are ovate, broadly ovate or very broadly ovate. The bracts are similar to the leaves, 3.0–5.1 mm long and 1.1–3.7 mm wide and petiolate (lower bracts only) or sessile. The flowers are borne on a pedicel that is up to 32.9 mm long and densely hairy with non-glandular hairs sometimes also mixed with glandular hairs. The calyx is 3.8–7.9 mm long, regular, with all 5 lobes equally divided to the base of the calyx and rounded to subtruncate, usually glabrous but sometimes hairy with non-glandular or glandular hairs on the outside of the calyx, and with 3 prominent purple veins. The corolla is 13.2–14.2 mm long (including a 3.5–9.8 mm long corolla tube), bilabiate, straight or curved, tubular-funnelform, pink or lilac, lacking any dark veins or striations, and glabrous or hairy with tiny, sessile glandular hairs on the outside, and glabrous inside. The corolla lobes are 1.9–5.3 mm long, not spreading or spreading, obovate or obcordate and deeply emarginate. There are 4 stamens which are didynamous, with both the two long stamens and the two short stamens included or reaching the corolla tube opening. The style is 4.2–6.1 mm long, included, with an emarginate or capitate stigma. The ovary is 1.8–2.5 mm long. Fruits are glabrous capsules with loculicidal dehiscence, and fruiting pedicels are 11.7–53.9 mm long. There are about 80 seeds in each capsule, and seeds are 0.5–0.9 mm long and 0.3–0.6 mm wide, elliptic, with a regular two-layered, reticulate (having a net-like pattern) seed coat with thick, smooth, shallow, primary reticula.

Ourisia breviflora subsp. uniflora flowers from December to March and fruits in January and February.

The chromosome number of Ourisia breviflora subsp. uniflora is unknown.

== Distribution and habitat ==
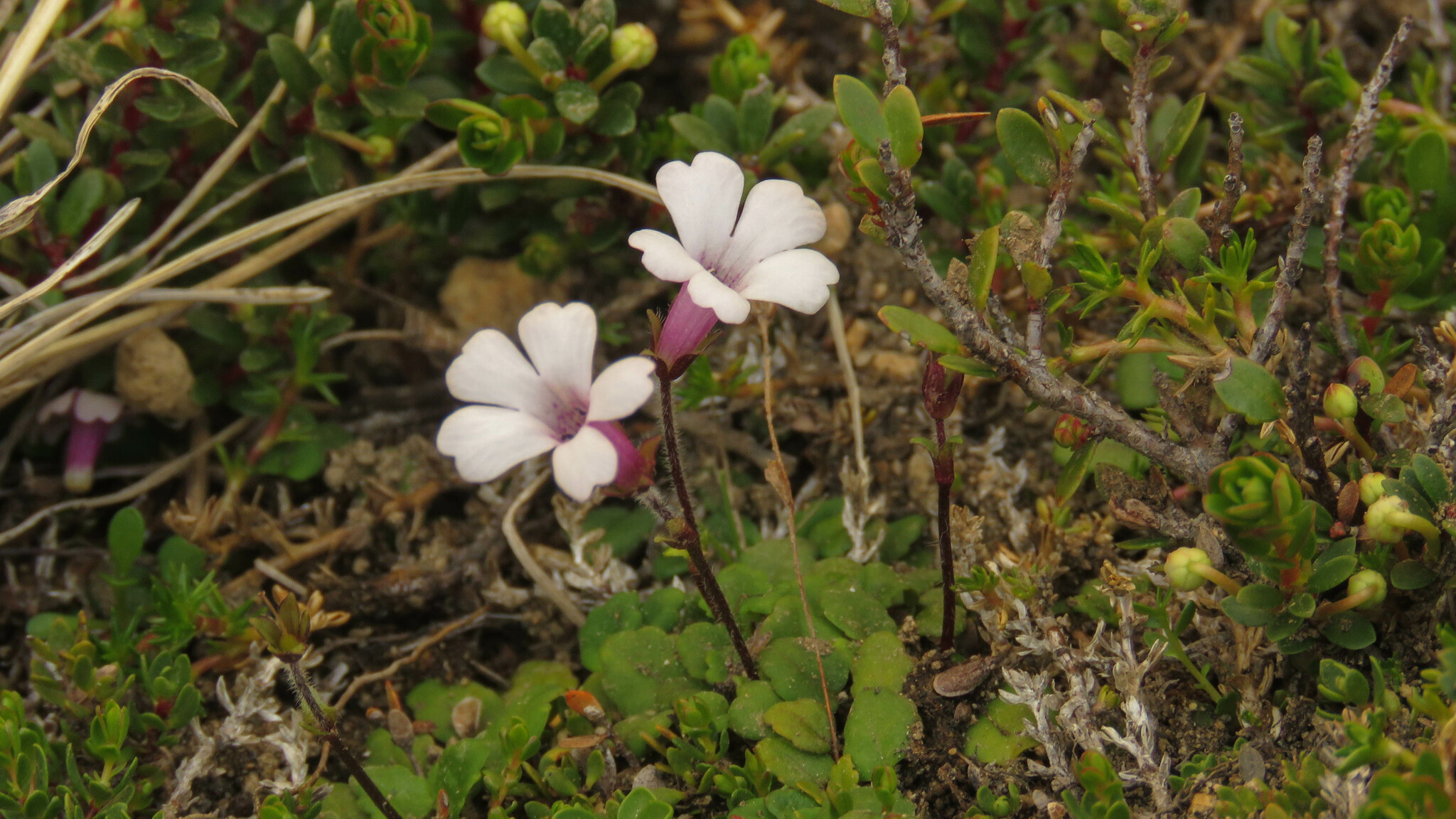
Flowering plant

Ourisia breviflora subsp. uniflora is endemic to the Andes mountains of Chile and Argentina from approximately 37°S to 44°S latitude. It is found in the Chilean regions of Biobío, Araucanía, Los Ríos and Los Lagos, and the Argentinean provinces of Neuquén and Río Negro, including multiple national parks. It can be found from 500 to 2000 m above sea level in wet, shady, rocky habitats such as stream banks in Nothofagus forest near the treeline.

== Phylogeny ==
No individuals of O. breviflora subsp. uniflora were included in a phylogenetic analysis of all species of the genus Ourisia, using standard DNA sequencing markers (two nuclear ribosomal DNA markers and two chloroplast DNA regions) and morphological data. However, O. breviflora subsp. breviflora was included and placed with high support in a clade of southern Andean herbaceous species, closely related to O. fragrans and O. ruellioides.
