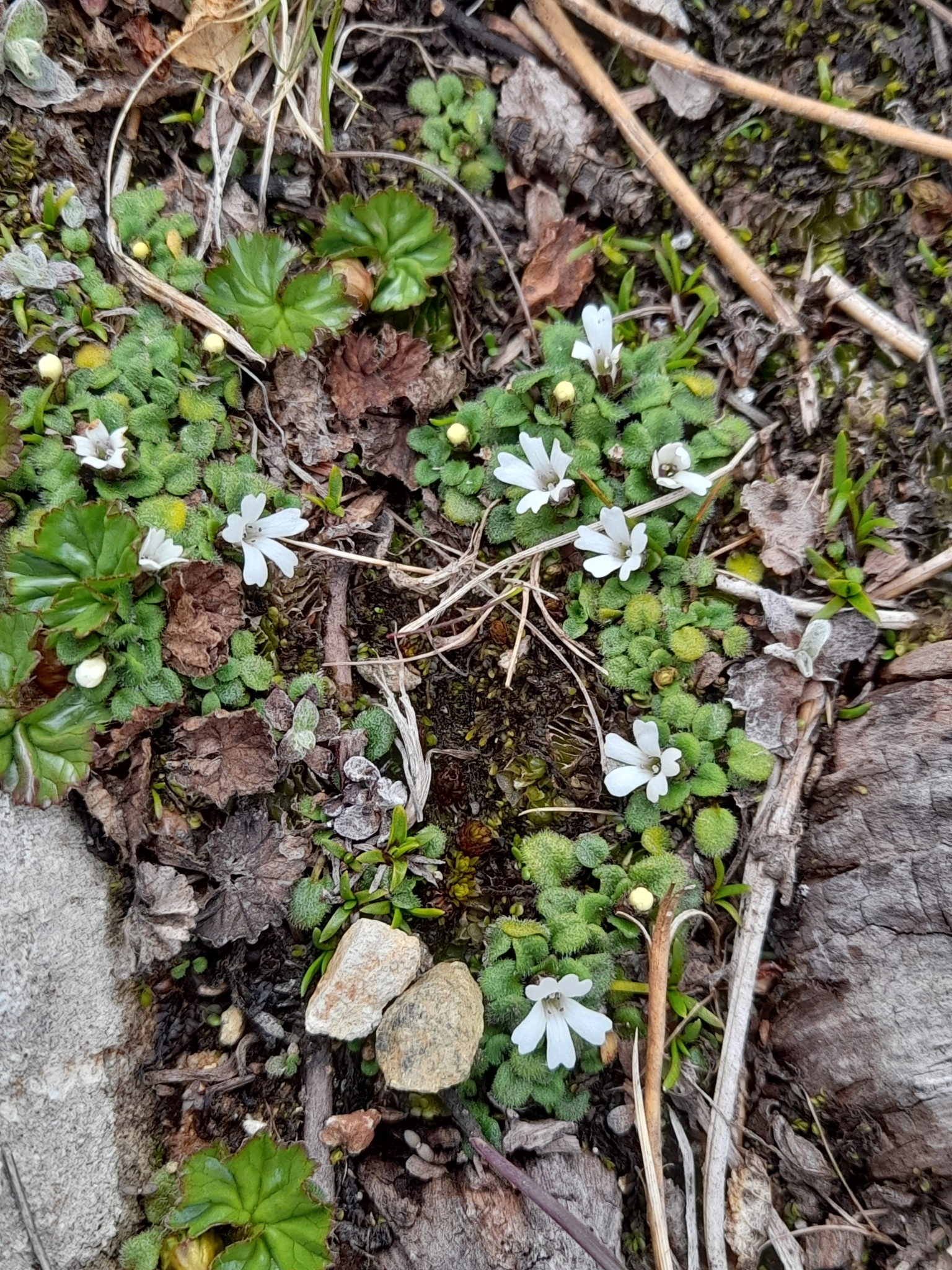
- Flowering plant of Ourisia fuegiana from Isla Navarino, Chile

Scientific classification
- Kingdom: Plantae
- Clade: Tracheophytes
- Clade: Angiosperms
- Clade: Eudicots
- Clade: Asterids
- Order: Lamiales
- Family: Plantaginaceae
- Genus: Ourisia
- Species: O. fuegiana

Binomial name
- Ourisia fuegiana Skottsb.

= Ourisia fuegiana =

Species of flowering plant

Ourisia fuegiana is a species of flowering plant in the family Plantaginaceae that is endemic to mountainous habitats of the Andes of southern Argentina and Chile. Swedish botanist Carl Skottsberg described O. fuegiana in 1916. Plants of this species are very small, with solitary white bilabiate corollas, a subregular calyx with 5 ciliate lobes usually divided to the base, hairy leaves with non-glandular hairs only, and a very short stigma. It is found in Tierra del Fuego but is not endemic there; its geographic range extends north to 46°S.

== Taxonomy ==
Ourisia fuegiana is in the plant family Plantaginaceae. Swedish botanist Carl Skottsberg described O. fuegiana in 1916 based on specimens he collected on the Swedish Magellanic Expedition of 1907–1909. Skottsberg collected the type material in the Chilean Magallanes Region on the island Tierra del Fuego, in mountains on the western end of Lago Fagnano in 1908. The lectotype is at the Museum of Evolution of Uppsala University (UPS herbarium) and there is an isolectotype at the Swedish Museum of Natural History (S herbarium).

Ourisia fuegiana is one of the smallest species of Ourisia, similar in size to O. modesta from New Zealand, O. muscosa and O. biflora from the northern Andes, and O. pygmaea from the southern Andes. Together with its very small size, the following characteristics help distinguish Ourisia fuegiana from these and other species: its small, white, bilabiate corollas, its subregular calyx with 5 lobes usually divided to the base that are hairy on the edges, its hairy leaves with non-glandular hairs only, and its very short stigma.

Ourisia fuegiana is morphologically most similar to two other southern Andean species, O. pygmaea and O. breviflora. Plants of these three species have bilabiate corollas, and have plant parts that are either not hairy (glabrous) or have non-glandular hairs only. Ourisia fuegiana can be distinguished from these two species by its very small size of up to 1.7 cm tall (vs. 1.4–25 cm tall in O. pygmaea and O. breviflora), its white corolla of less than 5.8 mm long (vs. white, lilac or pink corolla 7.7–21.0 mm long), and its short pedicels that are up to 2.4 mm long (vs. pedicels 3.6–32.9 mm long).

Compared to O. pygmaea, O. fuegiana also has hairy leaves and petioles, petiolate floral bracts, corolla lobes that are not spreading, and short styles <1.6 mm long (vs. glabrous leaves and petioles, sessile floral bracts, spreading corolla lobes, and longer styles >2.5 mm in O. pygmaea). In addition, O. fuegiana has smaller calyces (up to 3.5 mm long) compared to O. breviflora (over 3.8 mm long).

The geographic distribution of O. fuegiana (46°S to 56°S) does not overlap with that of O. pygmaea (37°S to 45°S) or O. breviflora subsp. uniflora (37°S to 44°S), whereas it is almost completely overlapping with the geographic range of O. breviflora subsp. breviflora (44°S to 56°S).

The species epithet "fuegiana" refers to the type location where it was collected, and although David Moore considered the species to be endemic to Tierra del Fuego, its range extends as far north as 46°S.

== Description ==
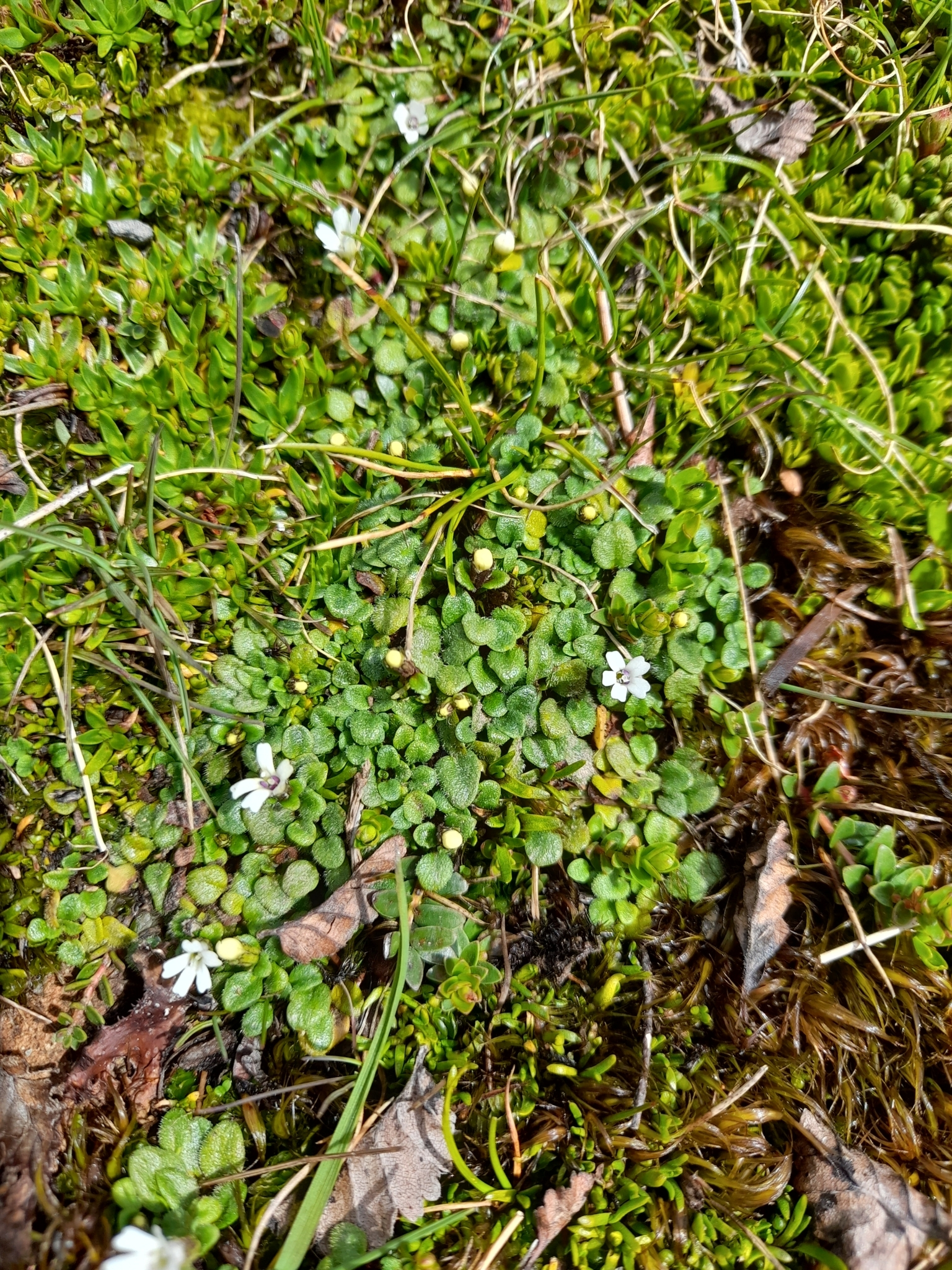
Flowering plant in damp habitat of Isla Navarino, Chile

Ourisia fuegiana plants are perennial, repent, mat-forming, subrosette herbs. The short stems are 0.6–1.5 mm wide, and glabrous (hairless). Leaves are tightly clustered in a subrosette, petiolate, 1.3–4.6 mm long by 1.2–3.7 mm wide (length: width ratio 1.1–1.3:1). Leaf petioles are 1.8–8.5 mm long with a few short non-glandular hairs. Leaf blades are ovate, broadly ovate, very broadly ovate, or circular, widest below the middle, with a rounded apex, cuneate or sometimes truncate base, and smooth, undulate or notched edges. The upper surface of the leaf is densely hairy with short non-glandular hairs and the lower surface is glabrous and punctate. Inflorescences are ascending or erect, up to 14 mm long, with a solitary flower, and each plant has usually only one inflorescence. Each flower has 2 bracts that are usually broadly ovate, very broadly ovate, narrowly obovate, obovate or broadly obovate. The bracts are similar to the leaves but smaller and sometimes widest above the middle, 1.3–3.0 mm long and 0.9–2.1 mm wide and petiolate. The flowers are borne on a pedicel that is up to 2.4 mm long and glabrous. The calyx is 2.2–3.6 mm long, usually regular, with all 5 lobes equally divided to the base of the calyx (or sometimes the 3 posterior lobes divided to a bit higher), each with 1 prominent vein and usually rounded, glabrous except for a dense covering of non-glandular hairs on the margins (edges) of the lobes. The corolla is 3.8–6.6 mm long (including a 2.3–3.6 mm long corolla tube), bilabiate, straight, tubular, white, and glabrous inside and outside. The corolla lobes are 1.3–3.3 mm long, not spreading, obcordate or obovate and emarginate. There are 4 stamens which are didynamous, with both the two long stamens and the two short stamens included or reaching the corolla tube opening. The style is 0.7–1.6 mm long, included, with an emarginate stigma. The ovary is 1.0–1.9 mm long. Fruits are glabrous capsules with loculicidal dehiscence, and fruiting pedicels are 1.0–4.3 mm long. The number of seeds in each capsule is unknown, and seeds are 0.7–0.9 mm long and 0.4–0.7 mm wide, elliptic, with a weakly two-layered (or one layered), reticulate (having a net-like pattern) seed coat with thick, smooth, shallow, primary reticula.

Ourisia fuegiana flowers from November to March and fruits from November to May.

The chromosome number of Ourisia fuegiana is unknown.

== Distribution and habitat ==
Ourisia fuegiana is endemic to the Andes mountains of southern Argentina and Chile from approximately 46°S to 56°S latitude. It is found in the Argentinean provinces of Santa Cruz and Tierra del Fuego and the Chilean regions of Aysén and Magallanes, including Tierra del Fuego National Park, and several islands such as Isla Navarino and Isla de los Estados. It is one of three species of Ourisia to reach Tierra del Fuego (together with O. ruellioides and O. breviflora subsp. breviflora). It can be found from 60 to 1200 m above sea level in wet or rocky habitats such as alpine bogs or cliffs, often near running water above tree line.

== Phylogeny ==
No individuals of Ourisia fuegiana were included in a phylogenetic analysis of all species of the genus Ourisia, using standard DNA sequencing markers (two nuclear ribosomal DNA markers and two chloroplast DNA regions) and morphological data.
