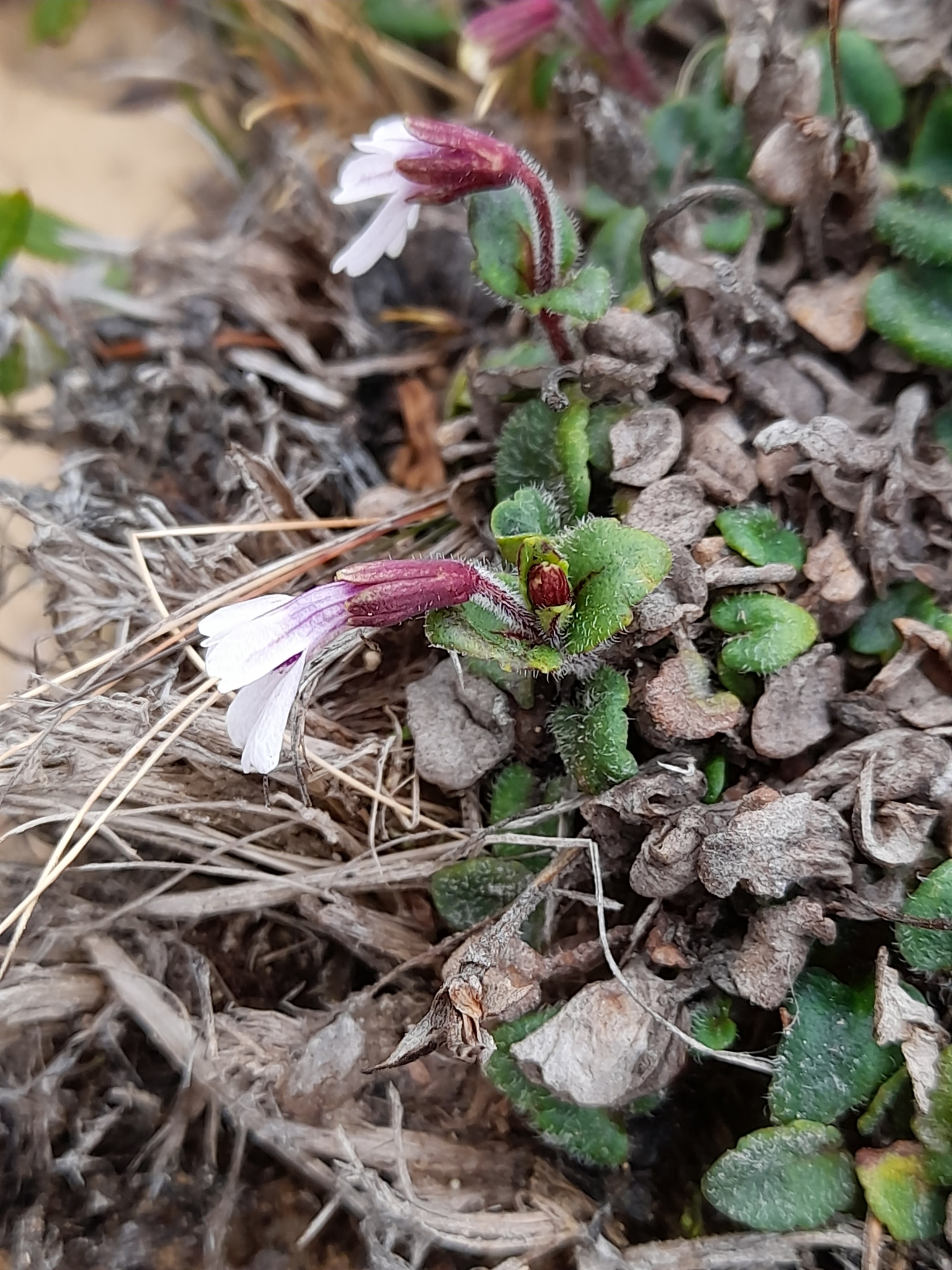
- Flowering plant of Ourisia breviflora subsp. breviflora from Navarino Island, Chile

Scientific classification
- Kingdom: Plantae
- Clade: Tracheophytes
- Clade: Angiosperms
- Clade: Eudicots
- Clade: Asterids
- Order: Lamiales
- Family: Plantaginaceae
- Genus: Ourisia
- Species: O. breviflora
- Subspecies: O. b. subsp. breviflora

Trinomial name
- Ourisia breviflora subsp. breviflora Benth. in DC.

= Ourisia breviflora subsp. breviflora =

Subspecies of flowering plant

Ourisia breviflora subsp. breviflora is a subspecies of flowering plant in the family Plantaginaceae that is endemic to mountainous habitats of the Andes of southern Chile and Argentina. George Bentham described O. breviflora in 1864. Plants of this subspecies are found in the southern part of the range of O. breviflora in the Andes of southern Chile and Argentina from 44 to 55°S latitude. They have long, sparsely to densely distributed hairs on the upper surface of the leaves, corollas that have dark purple striations, and floral bracts more than 5 mm long.

== Taxonomy ==
Ourisia breviflora subsp. breviflora is in the plant family Plantaginaceae. British botanist George Bentham described O. breviflora in Augustin Pyramus de Candolle's 1846 publication titled Prodromus.

English naturalist Charles Darwin collected the type material of O. breviflora in 1833 in the Chilean Magallanes Region in southern Tierra del Fuego as part of the second voyage of the HMS Beagle. American botanist Duncan MacNair Porter designated the lectotype, which is at the Herbarium at the Royal Botanical Gardens at Kew (K 00195396). There is also an isolectotype at Cambridge University Herbarium (CGE).

Ourisia breviflora subsp. breviflora is one of two allopatric subspecies of O. breviflora. It is distributed in the southern part of the range of O. breviflora, from 44 to 55°S latitude, in Chile and Argentina, whereas O. breviflora subsp. uniflora is found in further north from 37 to 44°S latitude.

Ourisia breviflora subsp. breviflora can be distinguished from subsp. uniflora by its long, sparsely to densely distributed hairs on the upper surface of the leaves, corollas that have dark purple striations, and floral bracts more than 5 mm long. These characters contrast with the usually glabrous (hairless) leaves, no dark purple veins on the corollas, and floral bracts up to 5 mm long of O. breviflora subsp. uniflora.

== Description ==
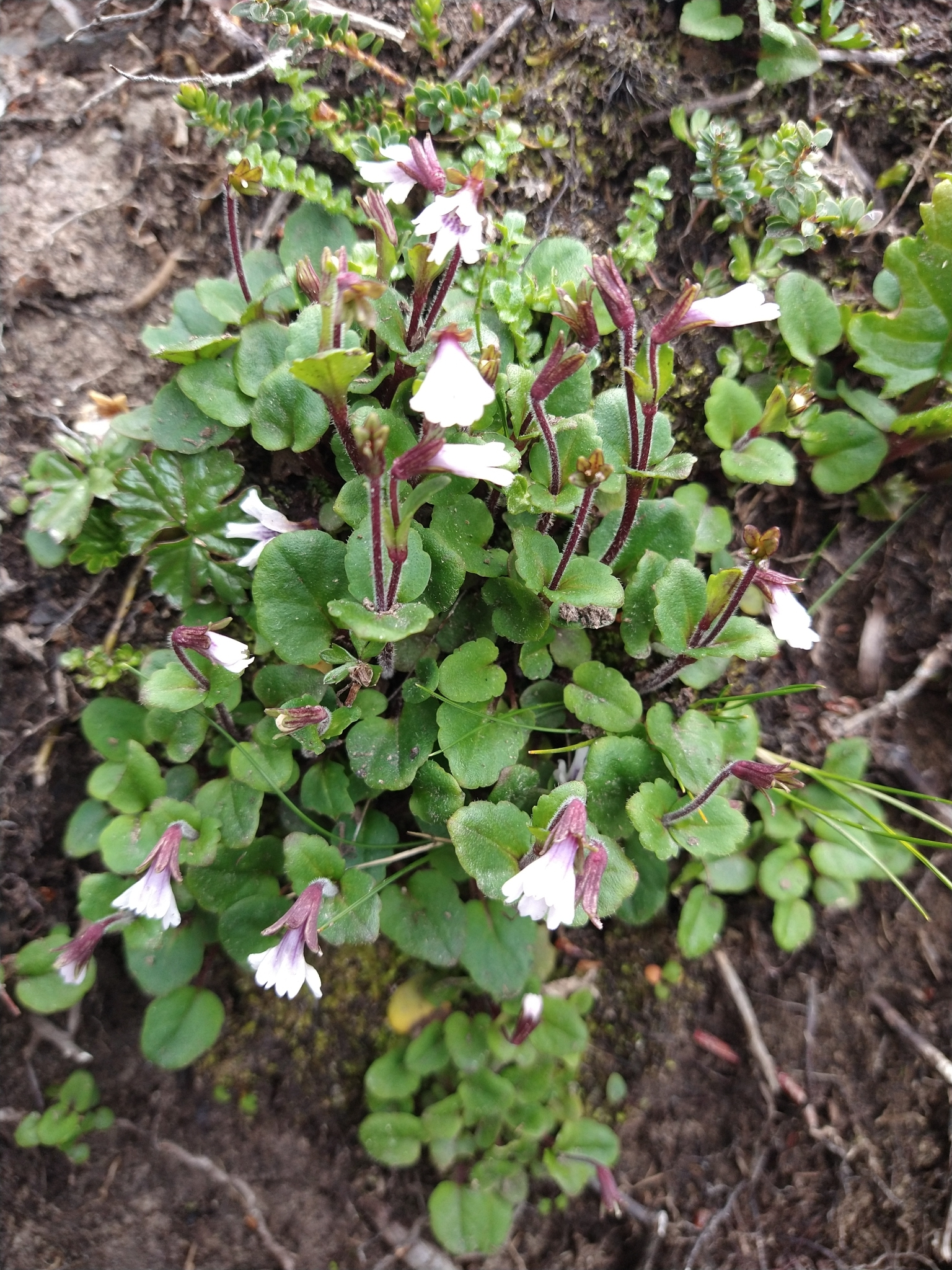
Flowering plant from Ushuaia, Argentina

Ourisia breviflora subsp. breviflora plants are perennial, erect, rosette herbs. The short stems are 1.1–4.0 mm wide, and glabrous (hairless) or hairy with short or long, non-glandular hairs. Leaves are opposite or tightly clustered in a subrosette, petiolate, 2.4–14.2 mm long by 2.0–13.2 mm wide (length: width ratio 0.9–1.2:1). Leaf petioles are 5.0–45.5 mm long and sparsely to densely hairy with short or long non-glandular hairs. Leaf blades are ovate, broadly ovate, or very broadly ovate, widest below the middle, with a rounded apex, cordate, truncate or cuneate base, and crenate edges. The upper surface of the leaf is sparsely to densely hairy and the lower surface is also punctate. Inflorescences are erect, with hairy racemes up to 12 cm long, and with 1–2 flowering nodes and up to 5 total flowers per raceme. Each flowering node has 1–2 flowers and 2 bracts that are ovate, broadly ovate or very broadly ovate. The bracts are similar to the leaves, 3.0–15.0 mm long and 2.5–13.9 mm wide and petiolate (lower bracts only) or sessile. The flowers are borne on a pedicel that is up to 32.9 mm long and densely hairy with non-glandular hairs sometimes also mixed with glandular hairs. The calyx is 3.8–7.9 mm long, regular, with all 5 lobes equally divided to the base of the calyx and rounded to subtruncate, usually glabrous but sometimes hairy with non-glandular or glandular hairs on the outside of the calyx, and with 1 or 3 prominent purple veins. The corolla is 8.0–11.9 mm long (including a 3.5–9.8 mm long corolla tube), bilabiate, straight or curved, tubular-funnelform, white, pale lilac or pale mauve with dark purple veins or striations, glabrous or hairy with tiny, sessile glandular hairs on the outside, and glabrous inside. The corolla lobes are 1.9–5.3 mm long, not spreading or spreading, obovate or obcordate and deeply emarginate. There are 4 stamens which are didynamous, with both the two long stamens and the two short stamens included or reaching the coreolla tube opening. The style is 2.3–3.0 mm long, included, with an emarginate or capitate stigma. The ovary is 1.8–2.5 mm long. Fruits are glabrous capsules with loculicidal dehiscence, and fruiting pedicels are 11.7–53.9 mm long. There are about 80 seeds in each capsule, and seeds are 0.5–0.9 mm long and 0.3–0.6 mm wide, elliptic, with a regular two-layered, reticulate (having a net-like pattern) seed coat with thick, smooth, shallow, primary reticula.

Ourisia breviflora subsp. breviflora flowers and fruits from November to March.

The chromosome number of Ourisia breviflora subsp. breviflora is unknown.

== Distribution and habitat ==
Ourisia breviflora subsp. breviflora is endemic to the Andes mountains of Chile and Argentina from approximately 44°S to 56°S latitude. It is found in the Chilean regions of Aysén and Magallanes, and the Argentinean provinces of Santa Cruz and Tierra del Fuego. It can be found between sea level and 1200 m above sea level in wet or humid habitats such as bogs, streams, waterfalls, heath, as well as rocky cliffs and crevices, often in orophytic (subalpine) areas in Nothofagus forest near the treeline. It is one of three species of Ourisia to reach Tierra del Fuego (together with O. fuegiana and O. ruellioides), where is part of the 'alpine meadow' plant community, including on Isla de los Estados, in three of the four main vegetational zones, i.e. Magellanic moorland, evergreen forest and deciduous forest.

== Phylogeny ==
One individual of O. breviflora subsp. breviflora was included in a phylogenetic analysis of all species of the genus Ourisia, using standard DNA sequencing markers (two nuclear ribosomal DNA markers and two chloroplast DNA regions) and morphological data. O. breviflora subsp. breviflora was placed with high support in a clade of southern Andean herbaceous species, closely related to O. fragrans and O. ruellioides, which have overlapping geographic distributions with O. breviflora. O. breviflora subsp. uniflora was not sampled in those studies.
