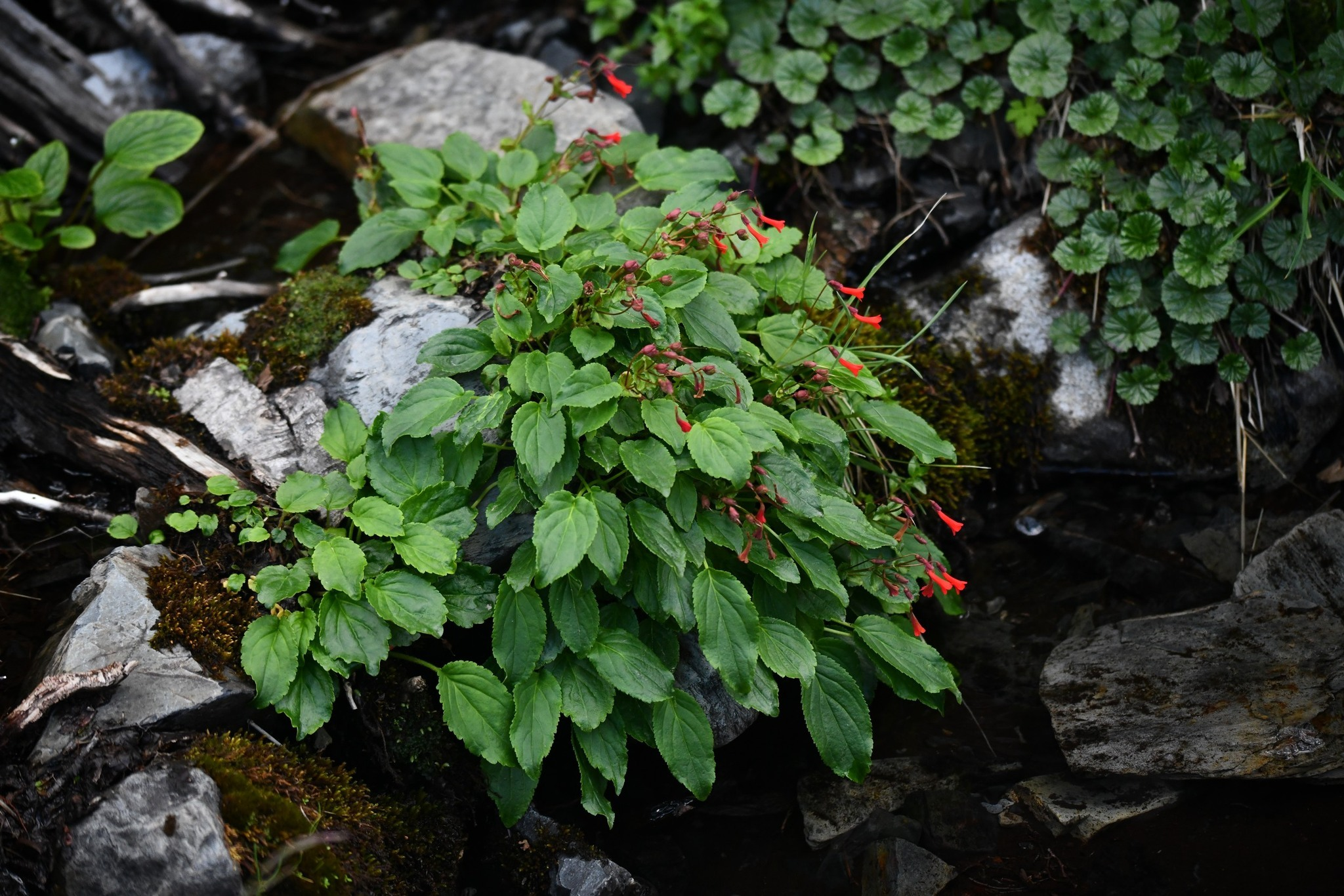
- Flowering plant of Ourisia ruellioides from Torres del Paine National Park, Chile

Scientific classification
- Kingdom: Plantae
- Clade: Tracheophytes
- Clade: Angiosperms
- Clade: Eudicots
- Clade: Asterids
- Order: Lamiales
- Family: Plantaginaceae
- Genus: Ourisia
- Species: O. ruellioides

Binomial name
- Ourisia ruellioides (L.f.)Kuntze

Synonyms
- Chelone ruelloides L.f.; Ourisia glabra Molina; Ourisia magellanica C.F.Gaertn.; Ourisia poeppigii Clos in Gay; Ourisia racemosa Pers.

= Ourisia ruellioides =

Subspecies of flowering plant

Ourisia ruellioides is a species of flowering plant in the family Plantaginaceae that is endemic to mountainous habitats of the Andes of southern Argentina and Chile. Carl Linnaeus the Younger described Chelone ruelloides in 1782, and German botanist Otto Kuntze transferred it to the genus Ourisia in 1898. Plants of this species are large, showy plants with red, tubular almost regular corollas that are glabrous (hairless) inside the corolla tube, an irregular ciliate calyx with two calyx lobes deeply divided and three shallowly divided, and glabrous, serrate, ovate leaves. It is the most widespread and common species of Ourisia spanning 22 degrees of latitude and is the type species of the genus Ourisia.

== Taxonomy ==
Ourisia ruellioides is in the plant family Plantaginaceae. It is the type species of the genus Ourisia.

Swedish naturalist Carl Linnaeus the Younger described Chelone ruelloides in 1782 based on specimens collected in Tierra del Fuego on Cook's second voyage by Georg Forster, who, together with his father Johann Reinhold Forster, were naturalists on board Cook's ship. The holotype is in the Linnean Herbarium (LINN-Sm 1045.11) and possible isotypes are at several other European herbaria.

German botanist Otto Kuntze transferred the species to the genus Ourisia (as "Ourisia ruelleodes" in 1898. The original spelling of the epithet (Ourisia ruelloides) has been used in some scientific papers and databases, but "ruelloides" was corrected to "ruelloidies" in 2006.

Ourisia ruellioides is characterised by its large, showy habit with red, nearly regular, tubular, glabrous corollas, irregular calyces, and large, glabrous, serrate, ovate leaves. It also has some of the largest seeds in the genus (1.2–2.0 mm long, similar in size those of the Tasmanian species, O. integrifolia).

Some botanists recognised two or three taxonomic entities at the species or variety rank, e.g. O. poeppigii in the northern part of the range and O. ruellioides in the southern part. Morphological differences in plant size, calyces and hairiness may be clinal from north to south. Synonyms of Ourisia ruellioides include O. glabra, O. magellanica, O. racemosa and O. poeppigii.

Other Andean species of Ourisia with red tubular flowers similar to those of Ourisia ruellioides include O. coccinea and O. polyantha, also from the southern Andes, and O. chamaedrifolia, from the northern Andes. O. ruellioides and O. coccinea both have a large, showy habit and are sometimes confused, but O. ruellioides plants are largely hairless (if hairs are present, they are non-glandular), with subregular corollas up to 2.7 cm long that do not have striations, and leaves tightly clustered but not in rosettes. By contrast, O. coccinea plants are hairy and often have glandular hairs, corollas over 2.7 cm long that are bilabiate with prominent striations, and leaves in rosettes.

Other species of Ourisia from New Zealand with a large, showy habit and large fruits include O. calycina, O. macrophylla and O. macrocarpa. But O. ruellioides (and O. coccinea) can be distinguished from those species by their flowers only in pairs (not whorls) in each inflorescence node and red, glabrous corollas whose corolla lobes are not spreading or slightly so. By contrast, those New Zealand species have flowers in whorls and white corollas that are hairy inside with widely spreading lobes.

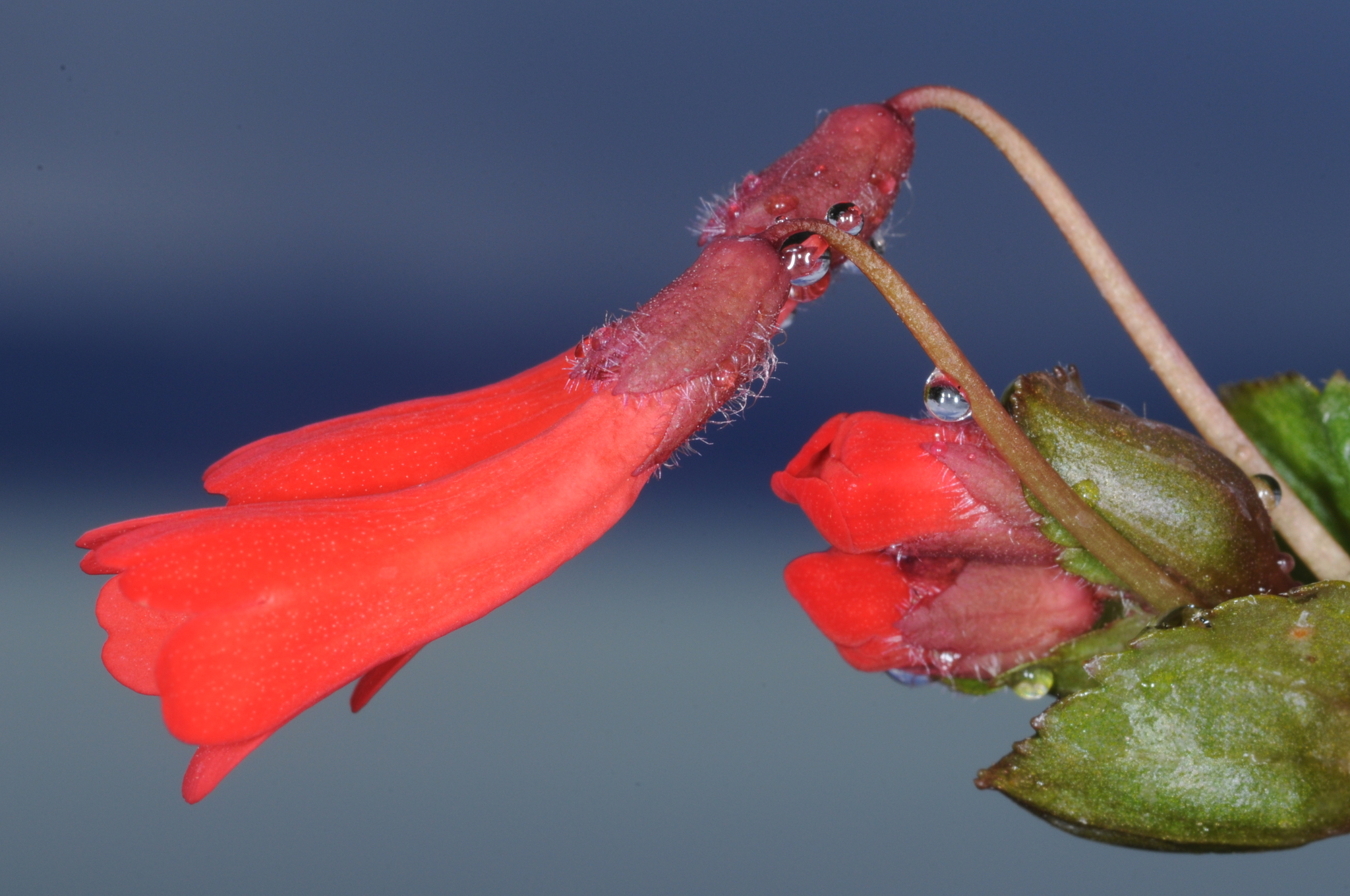
Close-up of flowers and buds from a plant at Lago Argentino, Santa Cruz, Argentina

== Description ==
Ourisia ruellioides plants are perennial, ascending to erect herbs. The short stems are 1.9–4.3 mm wide, and glabrous (hairless) or hairy. Leaves are opposite, tightly clustered, petiolate, 6.2–116.1 mm long by 4.4–71.3 mm wide (length: width ratio 1.2–2.0:1). Leaf petioles are 6.3–250.0 mm long and usually glabrous or hairy with long non-glandular hairs. Leaf blades are usually narrowly ovate, ovate or broadly ovate, widest below the middle, usually with an acute apex, truncate or cordate base, and serrate edges. The both surfaces of the leaf are usually glabrous or with a few long non-glandular hairs, and the lower surface is also punctate. Inflorescences are erect racemes, up to 44 cm long. Each inflorescence has 1–6 flowering nodes with one or two flowers and 2 bracts in each node. The bracts are similar to the leaves but smaller, 2.3–3.5 mm long and 0.8–1.6 mm wide, and sessile. The flowers are borne on a pedicel that is up to 62.5 mm long and usually glabrous, or sometimes with a few short or long non-glandular or sessile glandular hairs. The calyx is 5.0–9.1 mm long, irregular, with 2 lobes divided to the base of the calyx and 3 lobes divided one-sixth to one-half the length of the calyx, and usually glabrous but ciliate. The corolla is 18.8–28.9 mm long (including a 9.0–22.9 mm long corolla tube), subregular, straight or curved, tubular, red with yellow inside the tube, papillate and mostly glabrous inside and outside. The corolla lobes are 1.7–9.6 mm long, not spreading or slightly so, rounded, rectangular, obovate or obcordate. There are 4 stamens which are didynamous, with the two long stamens exserted or at least reaching the corolla tube opening, and the two short stamens included or reaching the corolla tube opening. The style is 7.8–30.4 mm long, included, with an emarginate or capitate stigma. The ovary is 2.3–5.2 mm long. Fruits are glabrous capsules with loculicidal dehiscence, and fruiting pedicels are 14.9–66.0 mm long. There are about 160 seeds in each capsule, and seeds are 1.2–2.0 mm long and 0.4–0.7 2mm wide, elliptic, with a two-layered, reticulate (having a net-like pattern) seed coat with thick, smooth, shallow, primary reticula.

Ourisia ruellioides flowers from September to March, and fruits from October to April.

The chromosome number of Ourisia ruellidoides is 2n = 16.

== Distribution and habitat ==
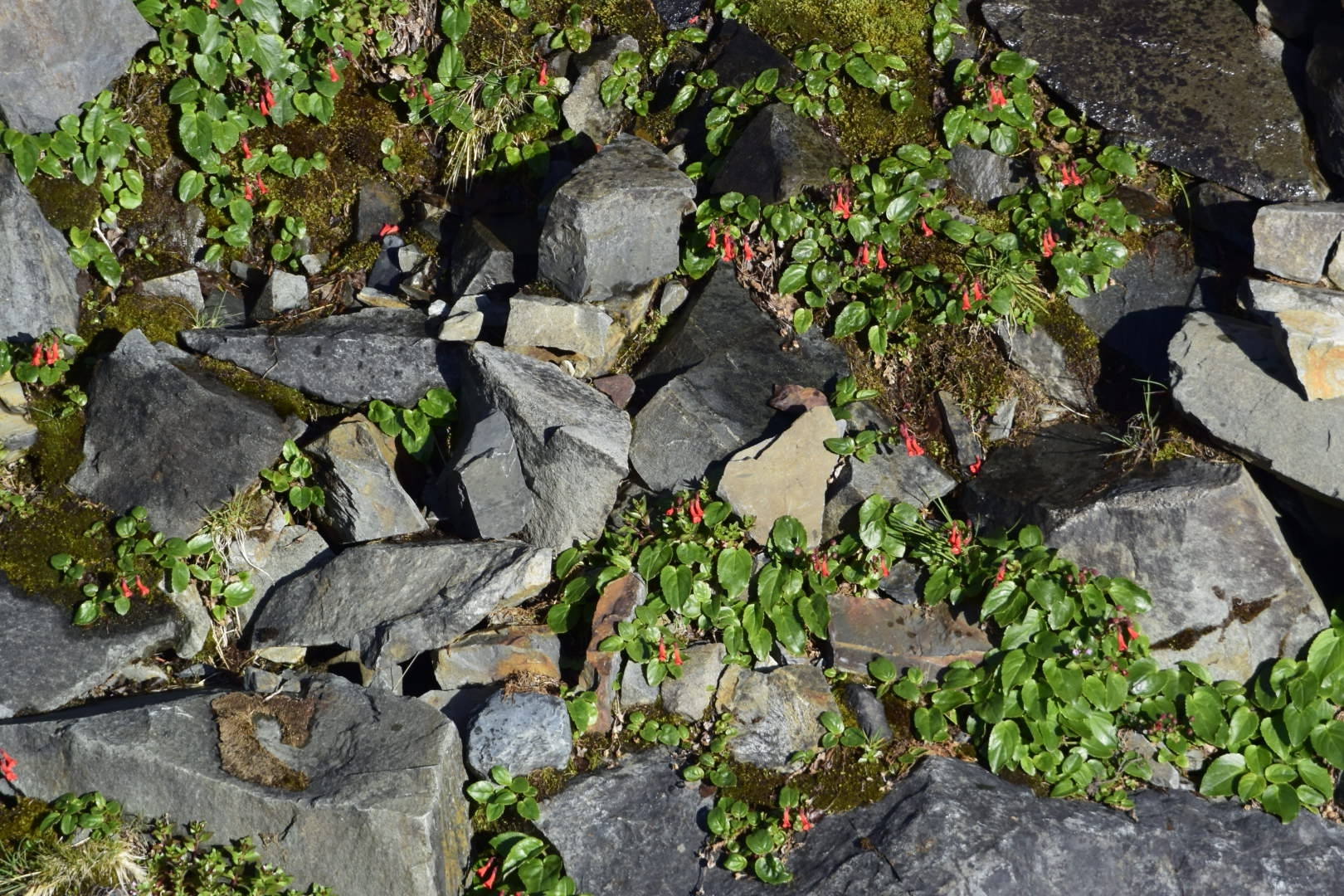
Flowering plants in a rocky, wet habitat in Torres del Paine, Chile

Ourisia ruellioides is endemic to the Andes mountains of southern Argentina and Chile from 34°S to 56°S latitude. Spanning 22 degrees of latitude, it is the most widespread and common species of Ourisia. In Argentina it is found from Neuquén, Río Negro, Chubut, Santa Cruz and Tierra del Fuego, including several national parks, and the Chilean regions of O'Higgins, Maule, Ñuble, Biobío, Araucanía, Los Ríos, Los Lagos, Aysén and Magallanes.

O. ruellioidies can be found from 0 to 2600 m above sea level in wet, rocky, shady habitats, including in Nothofagus forests, often in or near running water. It is one of three species of Ourisia to reach Tierra del Fuego (together with O. fuegiana and O. breviflora subsp. breviflora), where it is common in two of the four main vegetational zones, i.e. evergreen forest and deciduous forest, and found on several islands including Isla de los Estados.

== Breeding system ==
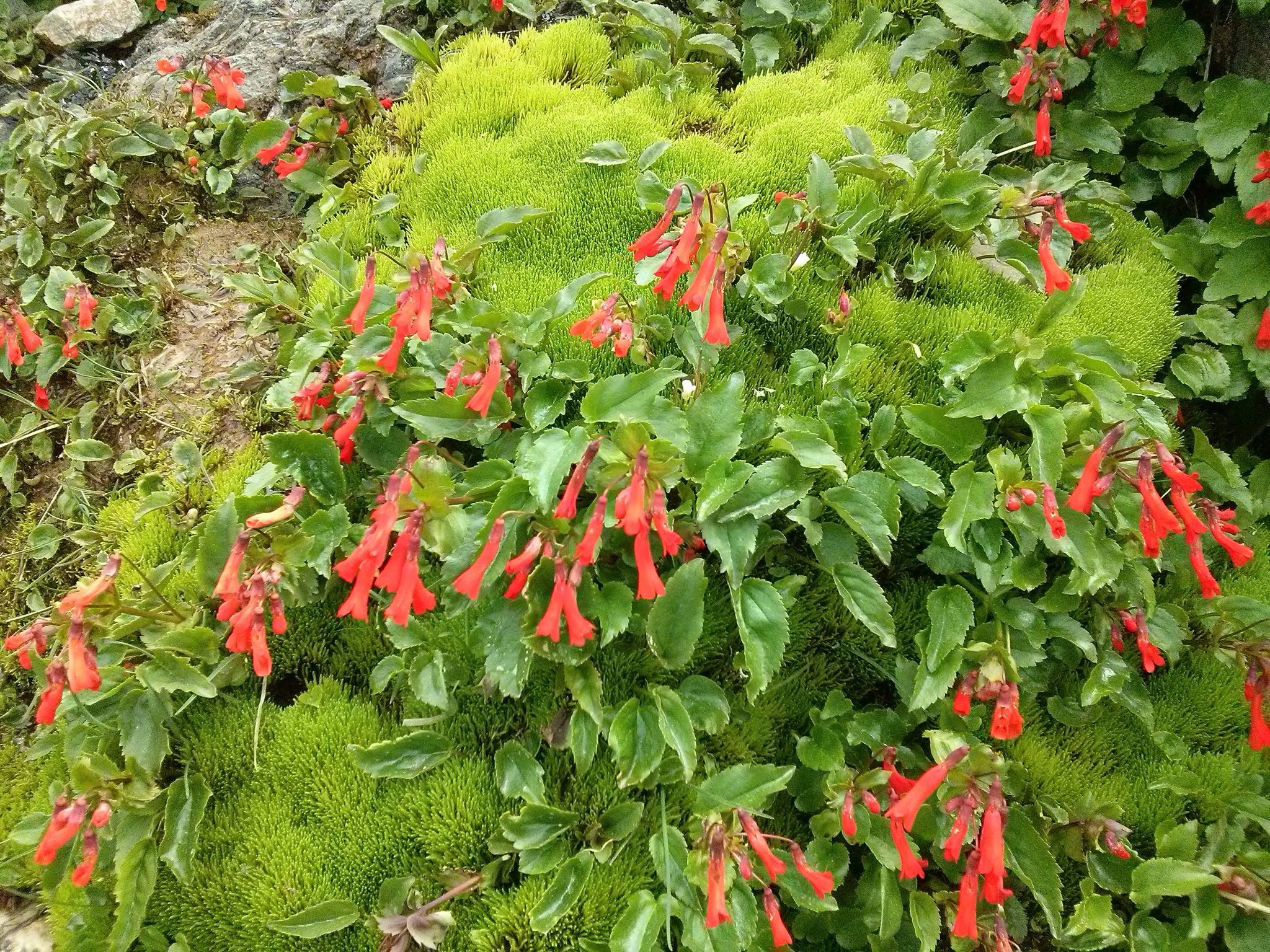
Habit of Ourisia ruellioides

The breeding system of O. ruellioides (as O. poeppigii) was found to be highly self-compatible and strongly autogamous. The flowers also contained abundant nectar. Although the red, tubular corollas suggest a hummingbird pollination syndrome, no pollinators of any kind were seen visiting plants of this species over two field seasons at Cerro Diente, in Torres del Paine National Park, Chile.

== Phylogeny ==
Four individuals of O. ruellioides was included in a phylogenetic analysis of all species of the genus Ourisia, using standard DNA sequencing markers (two nuclear ribosomal DNA markers and two chloroplast DNA regions) and morphological data. Ourisia ruellioides was monophyletic, with the sampled individuals showing a north-to-south nested pattern. O. ruellioides was placed with high support in a clade of southern Andean herbaceous species, closely related to O. fragrans and O. breviflora, which have overlapping geographic distributions with O. ruellioidies.

== Gallery ==
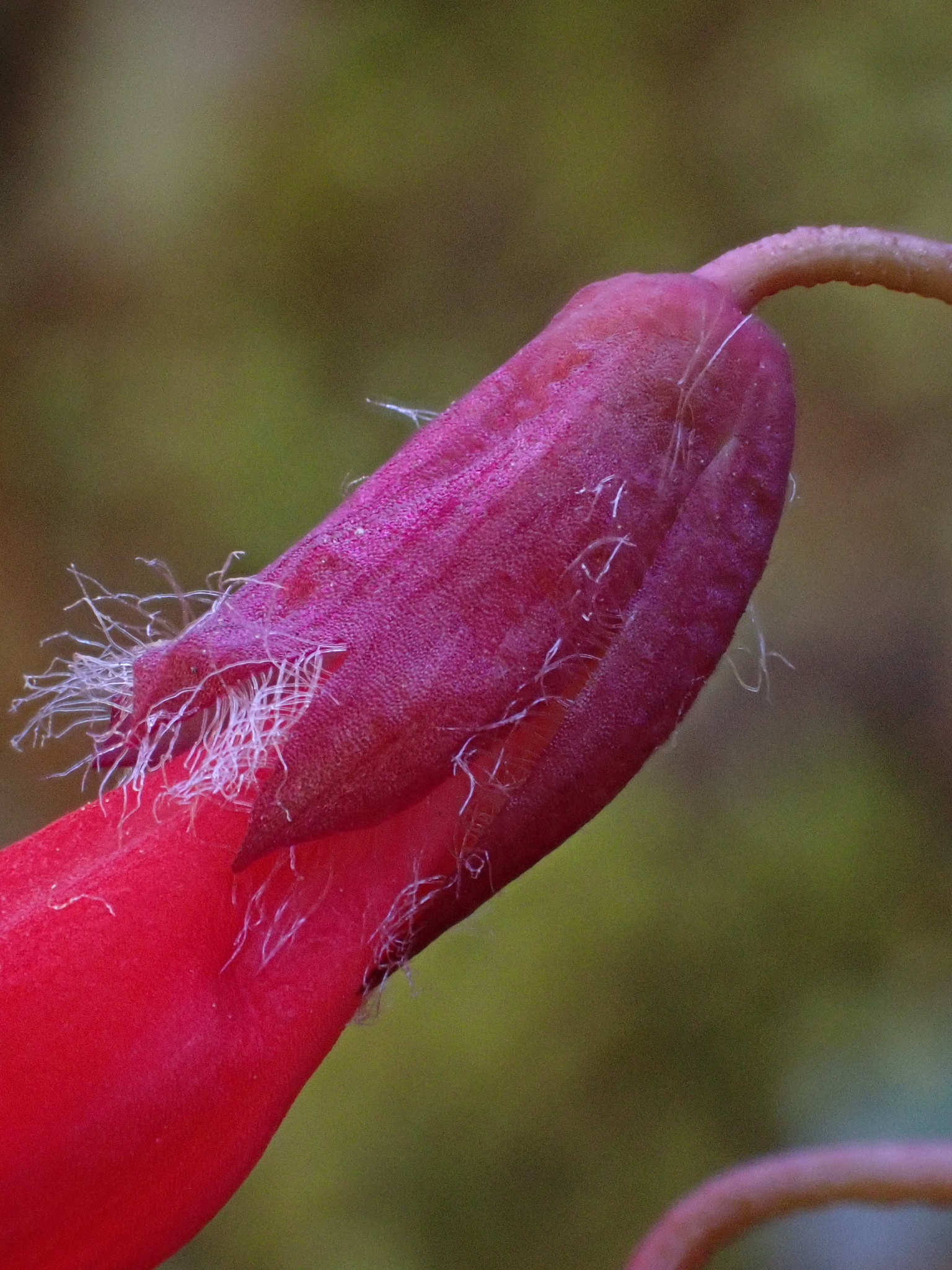
Close up of calyx

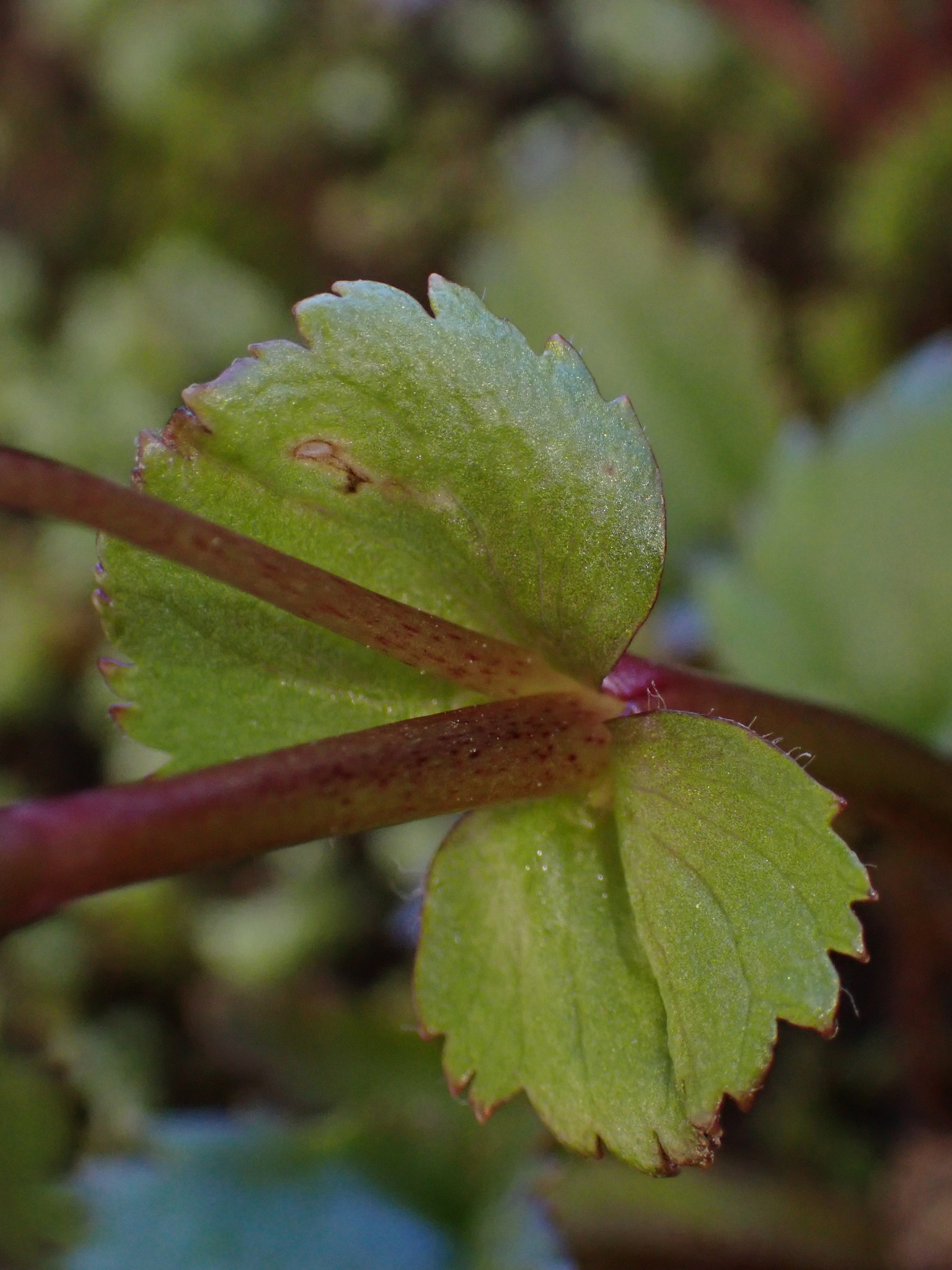
Close up of floral bracts

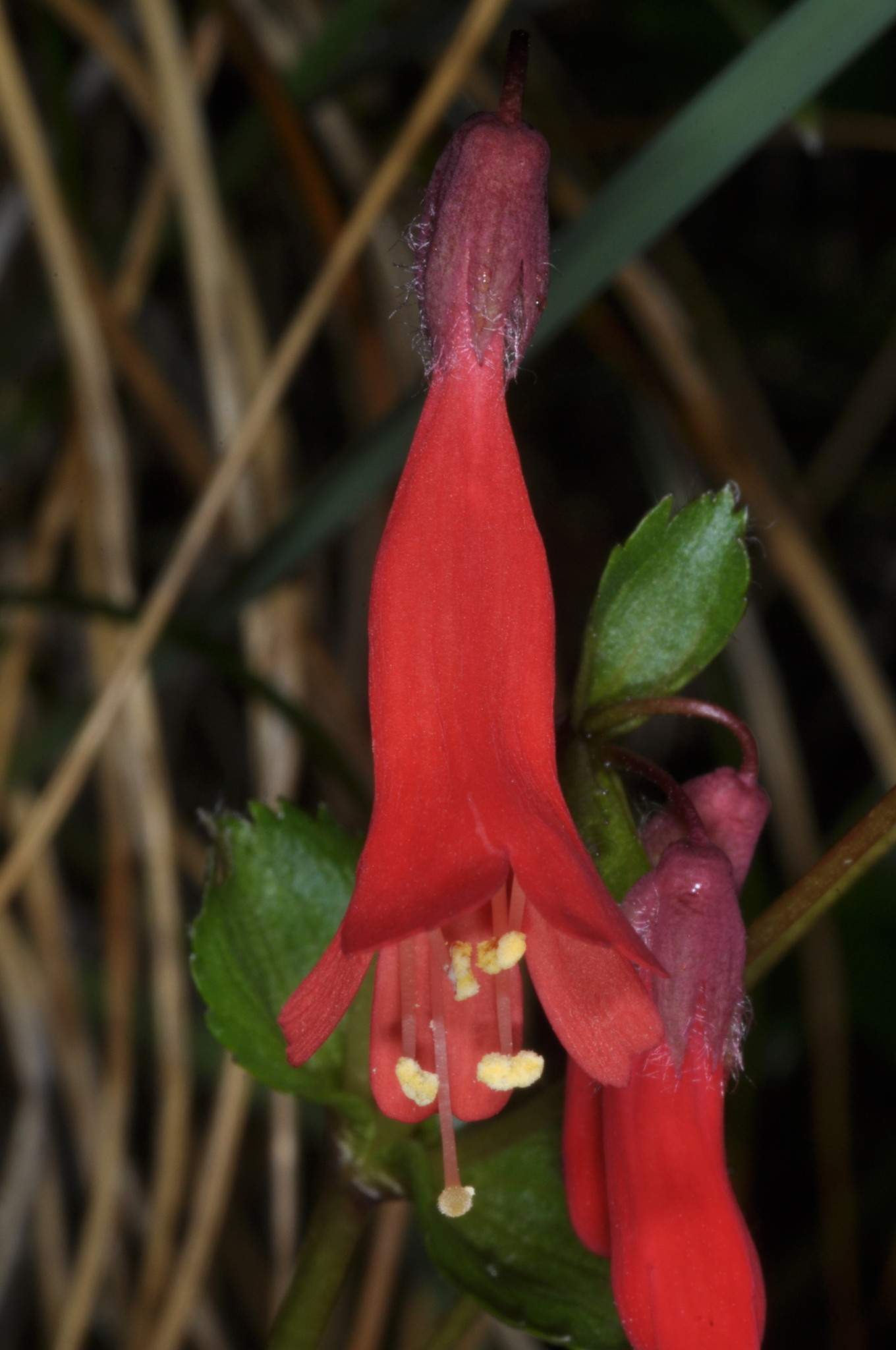
Corolla with exserted stamens and style

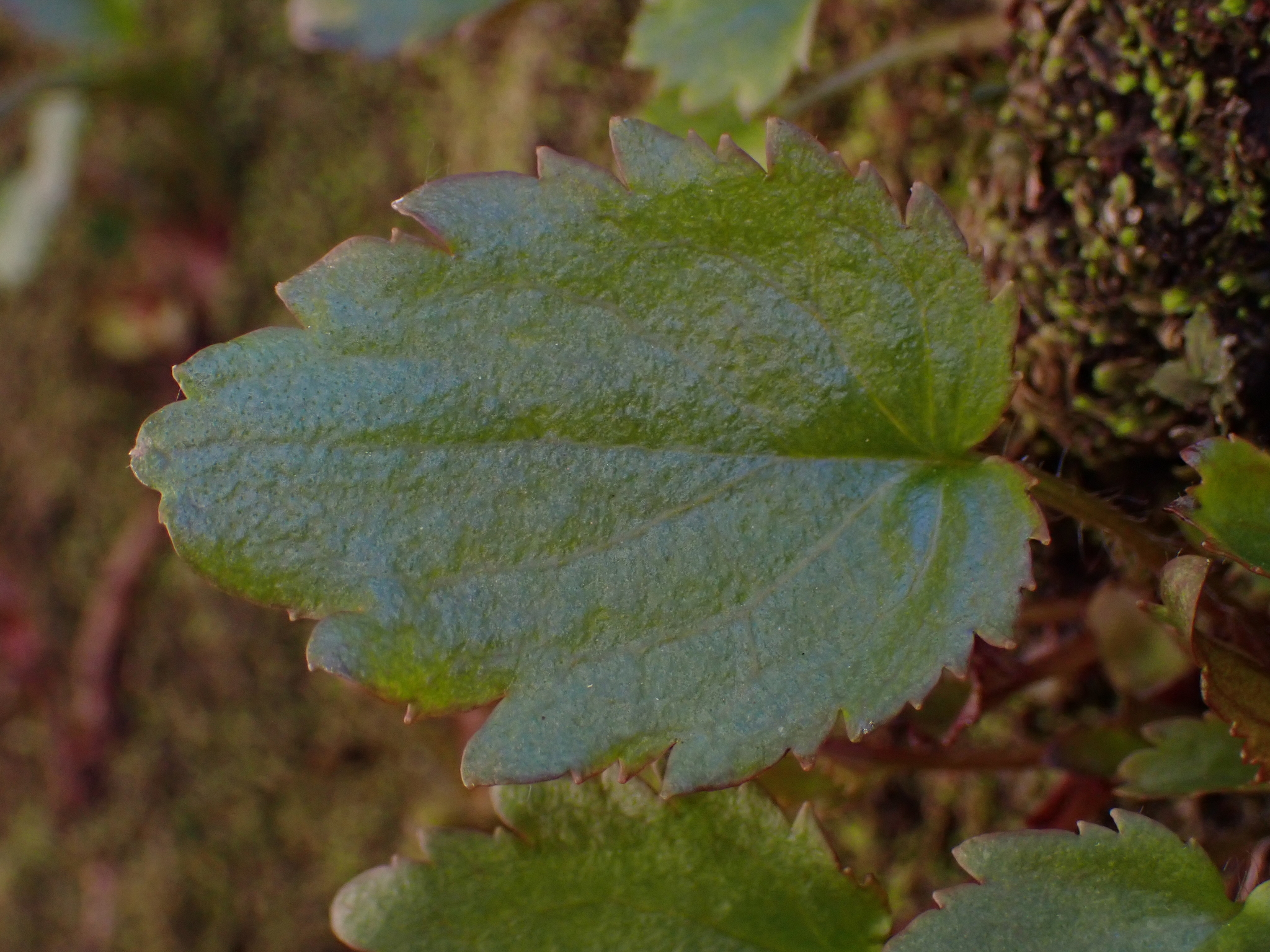
Close up of upper side of leaf

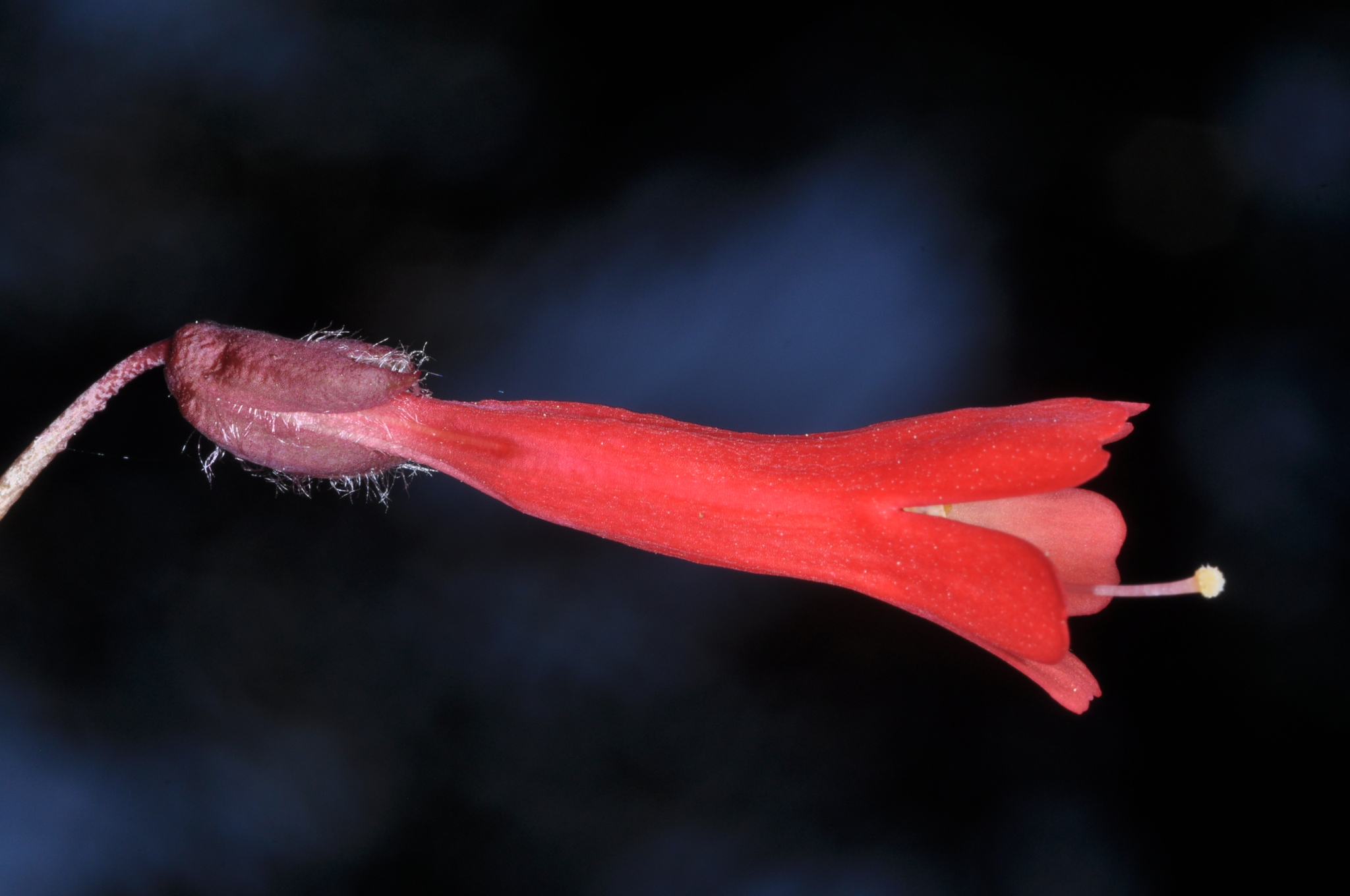
Close up of corolla, side view

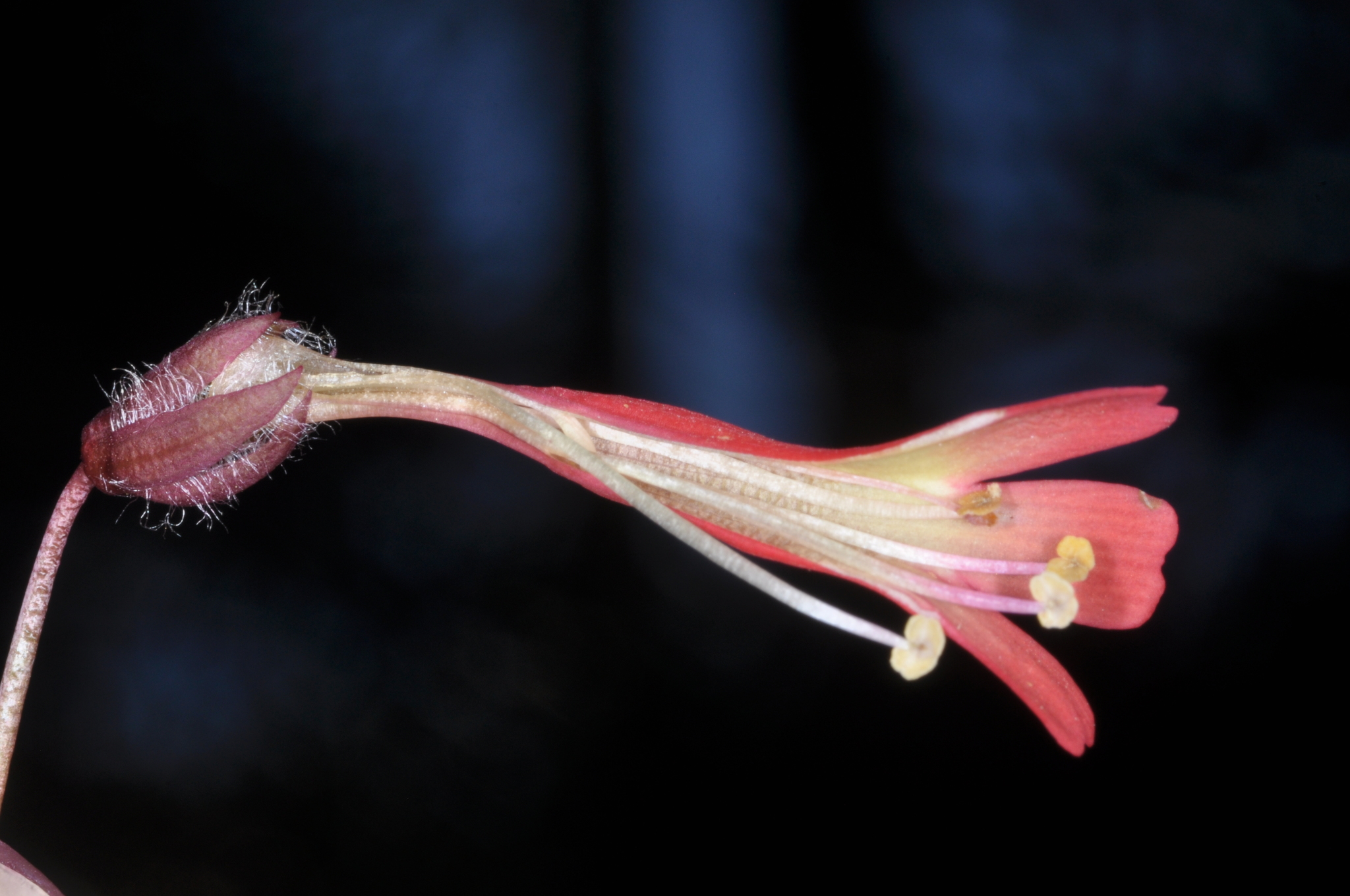
Close up of corolla, side view, dissected to show stamens and style

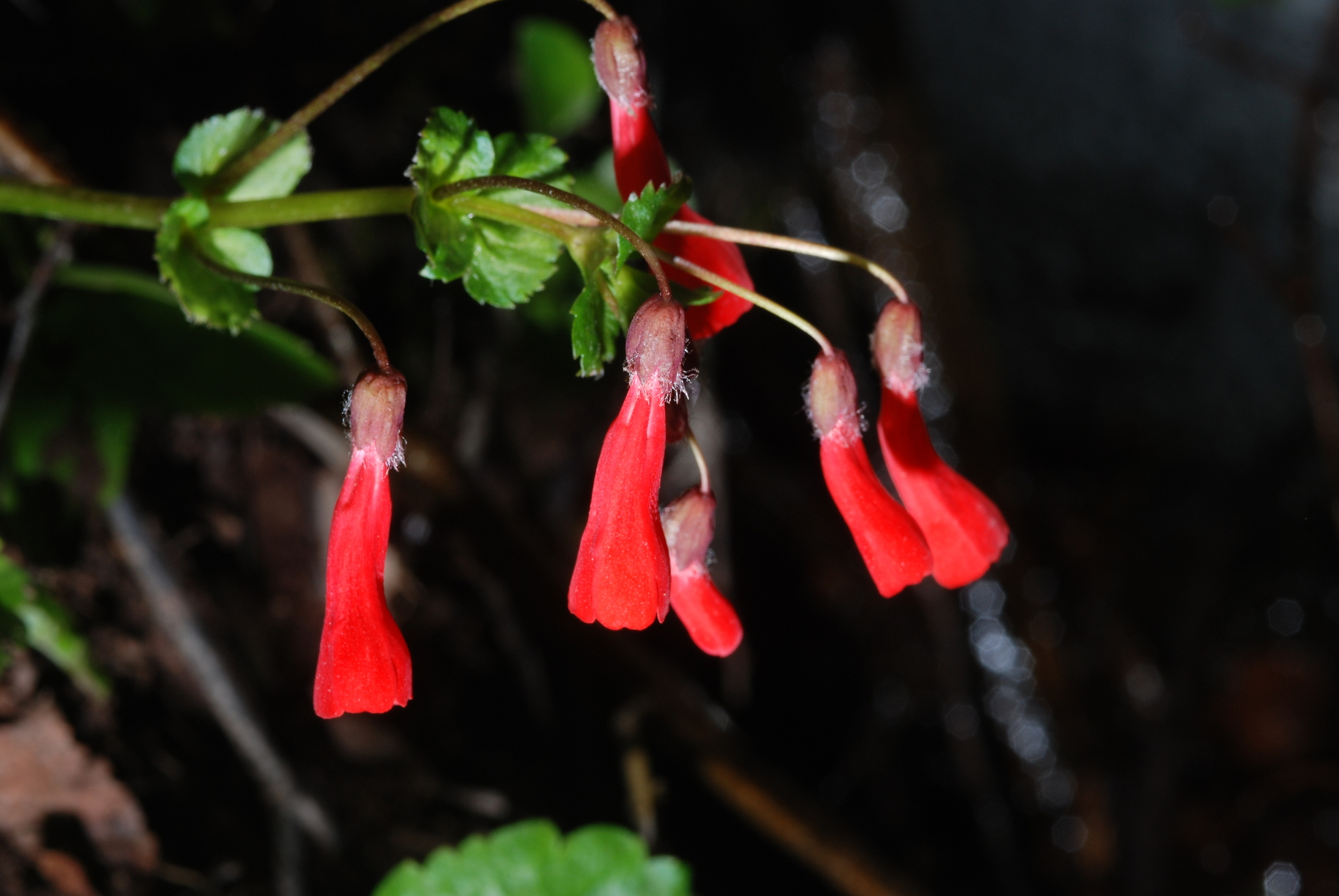
Inflorescence
