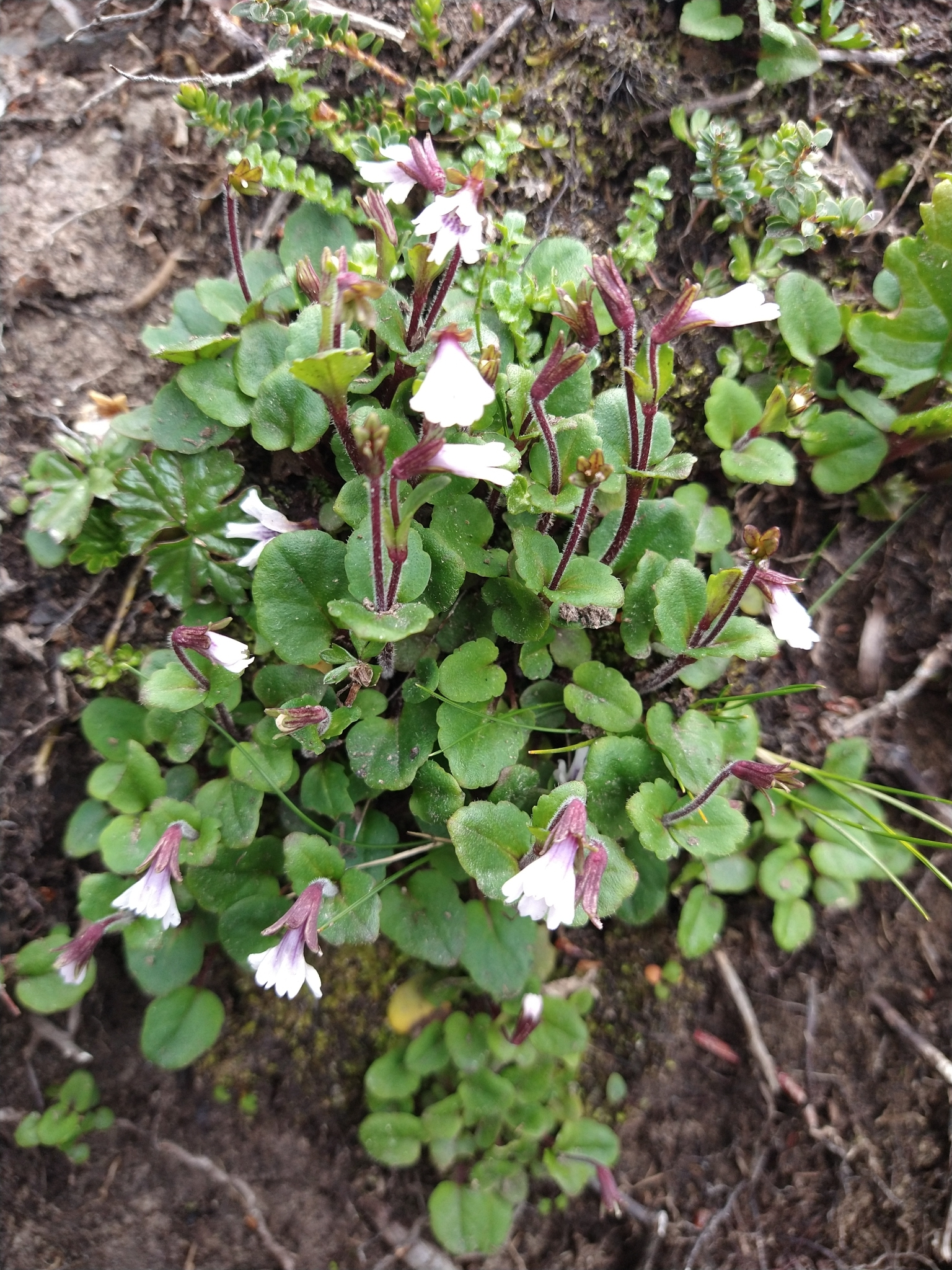
- Flowering plant of Ourisia breviflora from Ushuaia, Argentina

Scientific classification
- Kingdom: Plantae
- Clade: Tracheophytes
- Clade: Angiosperms
- Clade: Eudicots
- Clade: Asterids
- Order: Lamiales
- Family: Plantaginaceae
- Genus: Ourisia
- Species: O. breviflora

Binomial name
- Ourisia breviflora Benth. in DC.

= Ourisia breviflora =

Species of flowering plant

Ourisia breviflora is a species of flowering plant in the family Plantaginaceae that is endemic to mountainous habitats of the Andes of southern Chile and Argentina. George Bentham described O. breviflora in 1864. Plants of this species are rosettes with has crenate, hairy leaves, and the hairs on the plant are not glandular. Inflorescences are short racemes with 1 to 5 flowers. Flowers are usually solitary in each inflorescence node, corollas are bilabiate and pink to lilac, and calyx lobes are all equally divided to the base of the calyx. Two allopatric subspecies are recognised that can be distinguished based on leaf hairs, corolla striations, and floral bract size.

== Taxonomy ==
Ourisia breviflora is in the plant family Plantaginaceae. British botanist George Bentham described O. breviflora in Augustin Pyramus de Candolle's 1846 publication, Prodromus.

The type material was collected in the Chilean Magallanes Region in southern Tierra del Fuego by English naturalist Charles Darwin in 1833 during the second voyage of the HMS Beagle. The lectotype was designated by American botanist Duncan MacNair Porter and is housed at the Herbarium at the Royal Botanical Gardens at Kew (K 00195396) and an isolectotype at Cambridge University Herbarium (CGE).

Two allopatric subspecies of O. breviflora are recognised, with O. breviflora subsp. uniflora distributed in the northern parts of the species' range (37–44°S latitude in Chile and Argentina), whereas O. breviflora subsp. breviflora is found further south (44–55°S latitude).

The two subspecies can be distinguished by hairs on the upper surface of the leaves, the presence of coloured lines on the corolla, and size of floral bracts. Specifically, O. breviflora subsp. breviflora has long, sparsely to densely distributed hairs on the upper surface of the leaves, corollas that have dark purple striations, and floral bracts more than 5 mm long. By contrast, O. breviflora subsp. uniflora has usually glabrous (hairless) leaves, no dark purple veins on the corollas, and floral bracts up to 5 mm long.

== Description ==
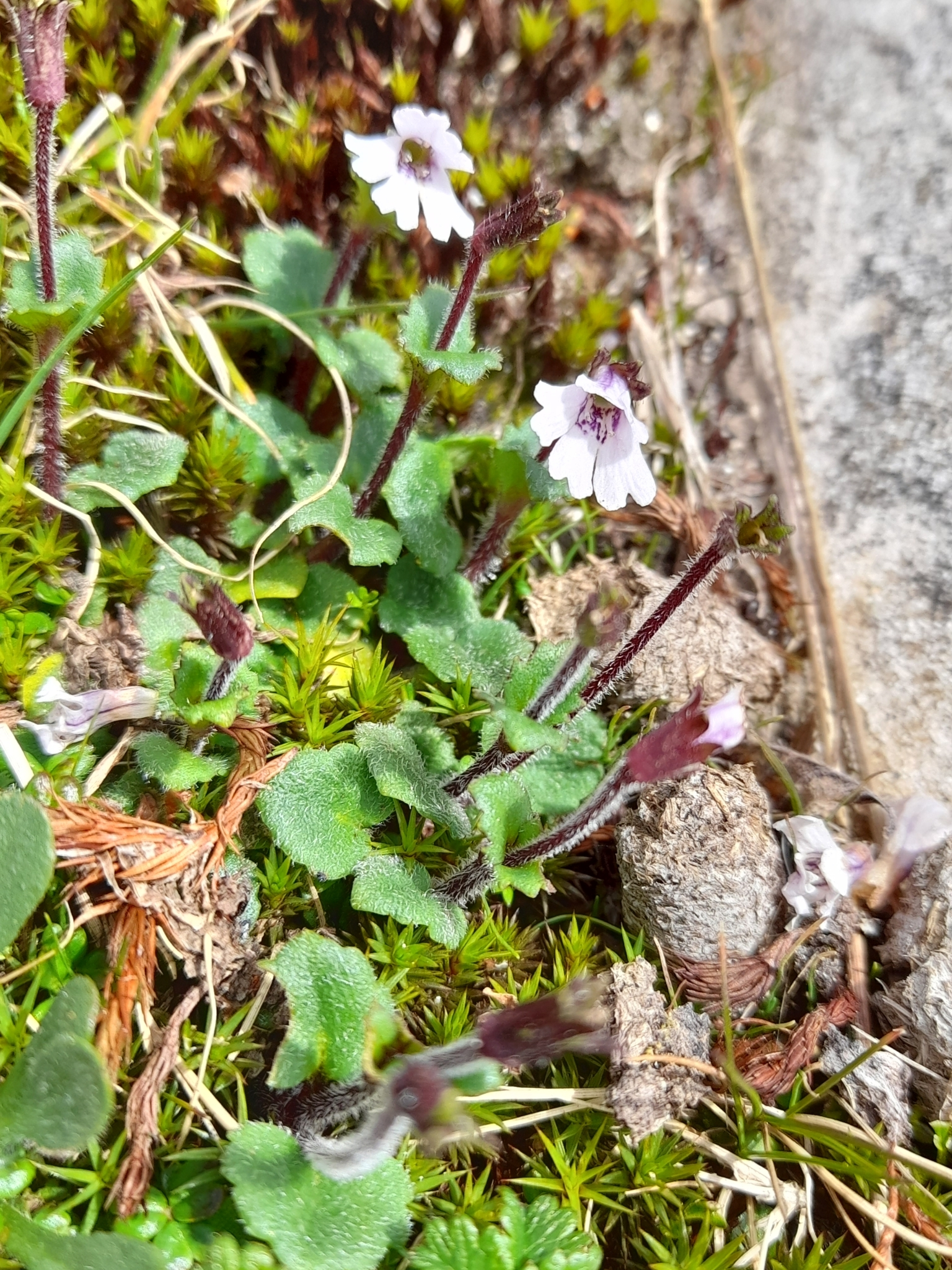
Flowering plant from Navarino Island, Chile

Ourisia breviflora plants are perennial, erect, rosette herbs. The short stems are 0.7–4.0 mm wide, and glabrous (hairless) or hairy with short or long, non-glandular hairs. Leaves are opposite or tightly clustered in a subrosette, petiolate, 2.4–14.2 mm long by 2.0–13.2 mm wide (length: width ratio 0.9–1.2:1). Leaf petioles are 1.6–45.5 mm long and sparsely to densely hairy with short or long non-glandular hairs. Leaf blades are ovate, broadly ovate, or very broadly ovate, widest below the middle, with a rounded apex, cordate, truncate or cuneate base, and crenate edges. Both surfaces of the leaves are glabrous or sparsely to densely hairy and the lower surface is also punctate. Inflorescences are erect, with hairy racemes up to 12 cm long, and with 1–2 flowering nodes and up to 5 total flowers per raceme. Each flowering node has 1–2 flowers and 2 bracts that are ovate, broadly ovate or very broadly ovate. The bracts are similar to the leaves, 3.0–15.0 mm long and 1.1–13.9 mm wide and petiolate (lower bracts only) or sessile. The flowers are borne on a pedicel that is up to 32.9 mm long and densely hairy with non-glandular hairs sometimes also mixed with glandular hairs. The calyx is 3.8–7.9 mm long, regular, with all 5 lobes equally divided to the base of the calyx, usually glabrous but sometimes hairy with non-glandular or glandular hairs on the outside of the calyx. The corolla is 8.0–14.2 mm long (including a 3.5–9.8 mm long corolla tube), bilabiate, straight or curved, tubular-funnelform, white or pale lilac, mauve or pink, sometimes with dark purple veins or striations, glabrous or hairy with tiny, sessile glandular hairs on the outside, and glabrous inside. The corolla lobes are 1.9–5.3 mm long, not spreading or spreading, obovate or obcordate and deeply emarginate. There are 4 stamens which are didynamous, with both the two long stamens and the two short stamens included or reaching the coreolla tube opening. The style is 2.3–6.1 mm long, included, with an emarginate or capitate stigma. The ovary is 1.8–2.5 mm long. Fruits are capsules with loculicidal dehiscence, and fruiting pedicels are 11.7–53.9 mm long. There are about 80 seeds in each capsule, and seeds are 0.5–0.9 mm long and 0.3–0.6 mm wide, elliptic, with a regular two-layered, reticulate (having a net-like pattern) seed coat with thick, smooth, shallow, primary reticula.

Ourisia breviflora flowers and fruits from November to March.

The chromosome number of Ourisia breviflora is unknown.

== Distribution and habitat ==
Ourisia breviflora is endemic to the Andes mountains of Chile and Argentina from approximately 37°S to 56°S latitude. It is found in the Chilean regions of Biobío, Araucanía, Los Ríos, Los Lagos, Aysén and Magallanes, and the Argentinean provinces of Neuquén, Río Negro, Santa Cruz and Tierra del Fuego. It can be found between sea level and 2000 m above sea level depending on latitude. O. breviflora is found in humid or wet habitats such as stream banks, waterfalls, rocky cliffs, crevices, bogs, and heath, in Nothofagus forest near the treeline in orophytic (subalpine) areas. O. breviflora is one of three species of Ourisia to reach Tierra del Fuego (together with O. fuegiana and O. ruellioides), where is part of the 'alpine meadow' plant community, including on Isla de los Estados, in three of the four main vegetational zones, i.e. Magellanic moorland, evergreen forest and deciduous forest.

== Phylogeny ==
One individual of O. breviflora was included in a phylogenetic analysis of all species of the genus Ourisia, using standard DNA sequencing markers (two nuclear ribosomal DNA markers and two chloroplast DNA regions) and morphological data. O. breviflora was placed with high support in a clade of southern Andean herbaceous species, closely related to O. fragrans and O. ruellioides, which have overlapping geographic distributions with O. breviflora.
