= Reiche =

Reiche is a family name of German origin:

- Daniel Reiche, a German soccer player.
- Dietlof Reiche, a German writer.
- Elena Reiche, a German pentathlete.
- Fritz Reiche, a German physicist.
- Gottfried Reiche, a German musician.
- Karl Friedrich Reiche, a German botanist.
- Katherina Reiche, a German politician.
- Louis Jérôme Reiche, a French merchant, manufacturer and entomologist.
- Maria Reiche, a German mathematician and archaeologist.
- Nora Reiche, a German handball player.
- Paul Reiche III, an American game developer.
- Reimut Reiche, a German sociologist.
- Rüdiger Reiche, a German rower.
- Steffen Reiche, a German politician.
- Wolfgang Reiche, founder of Dachgeber
