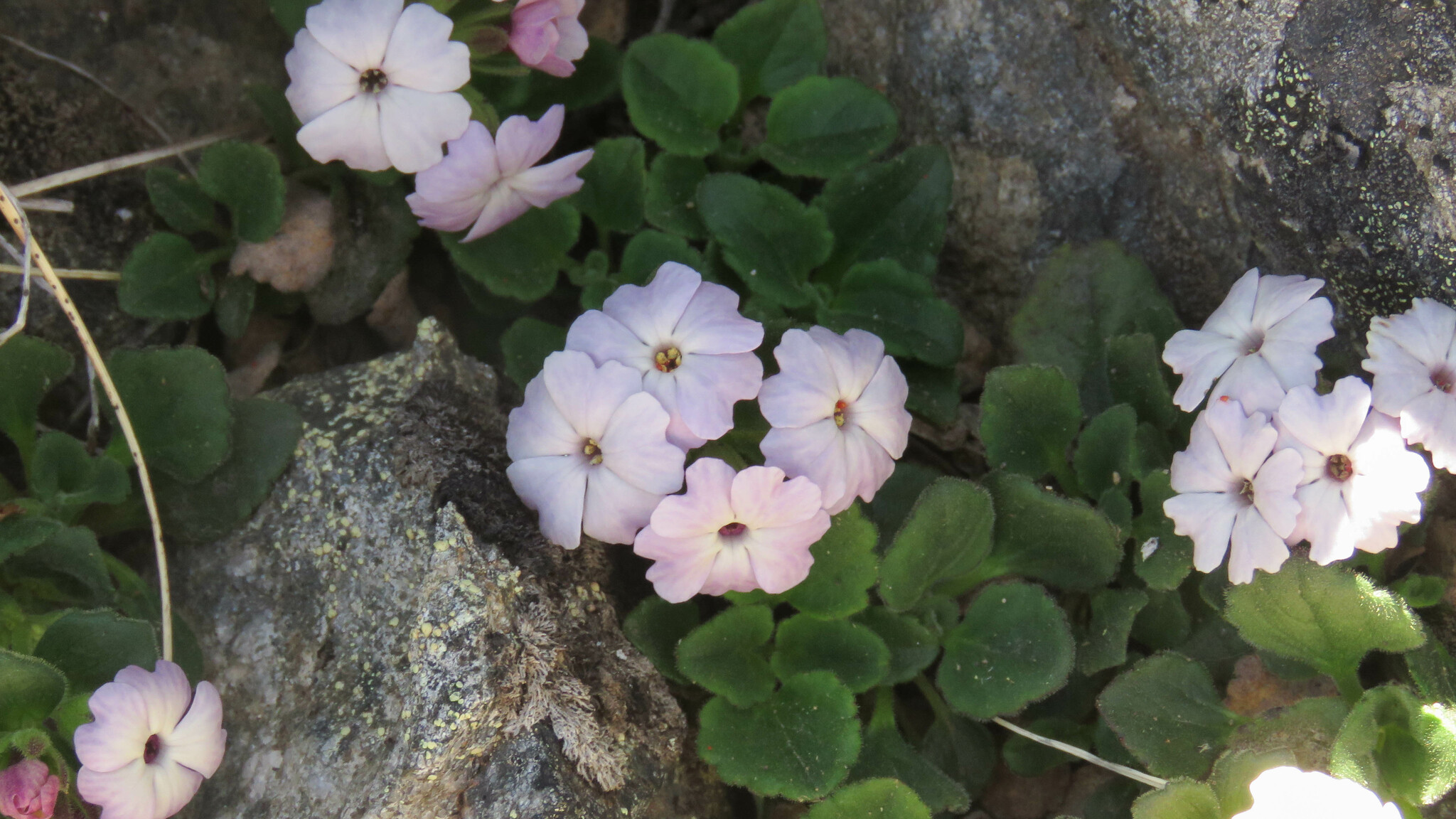
- Flowering plant of Ourisia fragrans from Bariloche, Argentina

Scientific classification
- Kingdom: Plantae
- Clade: Tracheophytes
- Clade: Angiosperms
- Clade: Eudicots
- Clade: Asterids
- Order: Lamiales
- Family: Plantaginaceae
- Genus: Ourisia
- Species: O. fragrans

Binomial name
- Ourisia fragrans Phil.

= Ourisia fragrans =

Subspecies of flowering plant

Ourisia fragrans is a species of flowering plant in the family Plantaginaceae that is endemic to mountainous habitats of the Andes of southern Argentina and Chile. Rodolfo Amando Philippi described O. fragrans in 1864. This species can be distinguished from others in the genus Ourisia by the glandular hairs on all vegetative parts, a nearly regular corolla that is white, pink or purple, and its five fertile stamens of equal length.

== Taxonomy ==
Ourisia fragrans is in the plant family Plantaginaceae. German-Chilean botanist Rodolfo Amando Philippi described O. fragrans in 1864.

British plant collector Richard Pearce collected the type material of O. fragrans in the Chilean region of Los Lagos at Cordillear de Ranco. The holotype is housed at the Chilean National Museum of Natural History in Santiago (herbarium SGO) (SGO 056366).

Ourisia fragrans can be distinguished from other species of Ourisia by the combination of glandular hairs on all vegetative parts (giving it a sticky texture), a subregular corolla (that can be white, pink or purple), and the five fertile stamens of equal length. By contrast, most other species of Ourisia have bilabiate corollas and four didynamous stamens.

The species epithet means "fragrant" or "scented" and the flowers have a pleasant scent.

== Description ==
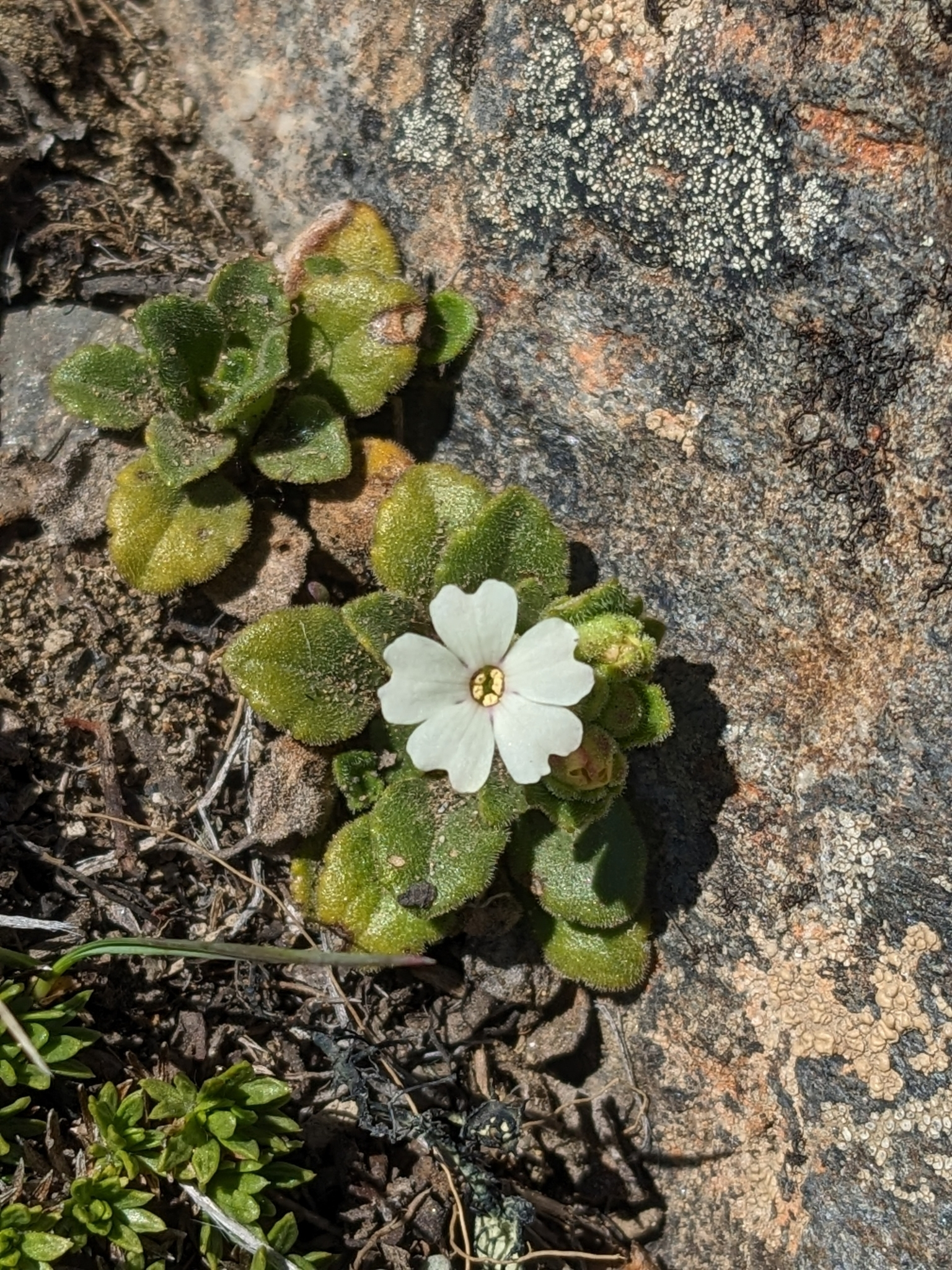
Plant with white, regular corolla with five equal stamens inside the corolla tube

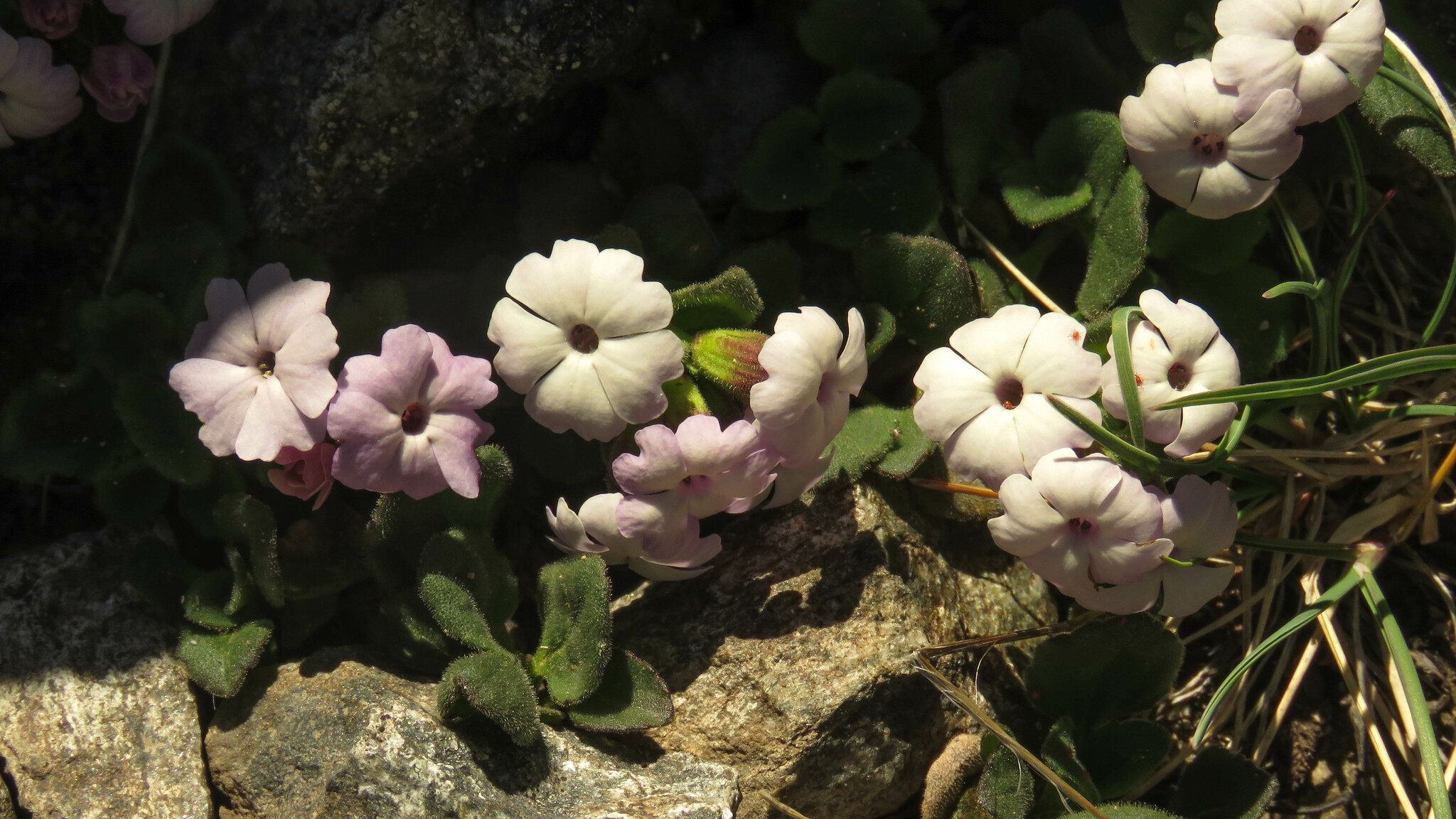
Corollas of differing colours

Ourisia fragrans plants are perennial, ascending to erect, subrosette herbs. The short stems are 0.9–2.7 mm wide, and glabrous (hairless) or hairy with short glandular hairs. Leaves are opposite or tightly clustered in a subrosette, petiolate, 6.0–21.1 mm long by 4.5–16.0 mm wide (length: width ratio 1.1–1.5:1). Leaf petioles are 4.2–26.9 mm long and sparsely to densely hairy with short glandular hairs. Leaf blades are ovate or broadly ovate, rarely narrowly ovate, widest below the middle, with a rounded or rarely subacute apex, cuneate base, and notched or crenate edges. Both surfaces of the leaf are usually densely hairy with a mixture of short glandular and non-glandular hairs (or sometimes glabrous on lower surface), and the lower surface is also punctate. Inflorescences are ascending or erect, with hairy racemes up to 24 cm long, and with 1–4 flowering nodes and up to 7 or more total flowers per raceme. Each flowering node has 2 flowers and 2 bracts that are narrowly obovate, obovate, broadly obovate, lanceolate or narrowly ovate. The bracts are similar to the leaves but smaller and sometimes widest above the middle, 5.7–14.0 mm long and 4.0–8.7 mm wide and petiolate (lower bracts only) or sessile. The flowers are borne on a pedicel that is up to 22.8 mm long and sparsely to densely hairy with short glandular hairs. The calyx is 6.0–10.1 mm long, regular, with all 5 lobes equally divided to one-half to three-quarters the length of the calyx, each with 3 prominent purple veins and acute, glabrous or sparsely to densely hairy on the outside and margins with a mixture of short glandular and non-glandular hairs. The corolla is 15.8–19.7 mm long (including a 6.0–14.1 mm long corolla tube), regular, straight, tubular-funnelform, white, pink or purple, and glabrous or hairy with glandular hairs on the outside, and glabrous inside. The corolla lobes are 4.2–6.4 mm long, spreading or explanate, obcordate and deeply emarginate. There are 5 stamens which are of equal length, included or reaching the coreolla tube opening. The style is 1.7–3.5 mm long, included, with an emarginate or capitate stigma. The ovary is 0.6–3.2 mm long. Fruits are glabrous capsules with loculicidal dehiscence, and fruiting pedicels are 7.0–8.5 mm long. The number of seeds in each capsule is unknown, and seeds are 1.0–1.1 mm long and about 0.6 mm wide, elliptic, with a regular two-layered, reticulate (having a net-like pattern) seed coat with thick, smooth, shallow, primary reticula.

Ourisia fragrans flowers from December to March and fruits in March.

The chromosome number of Ourisia fragrans is unknown.

== Distribution and habitat ==
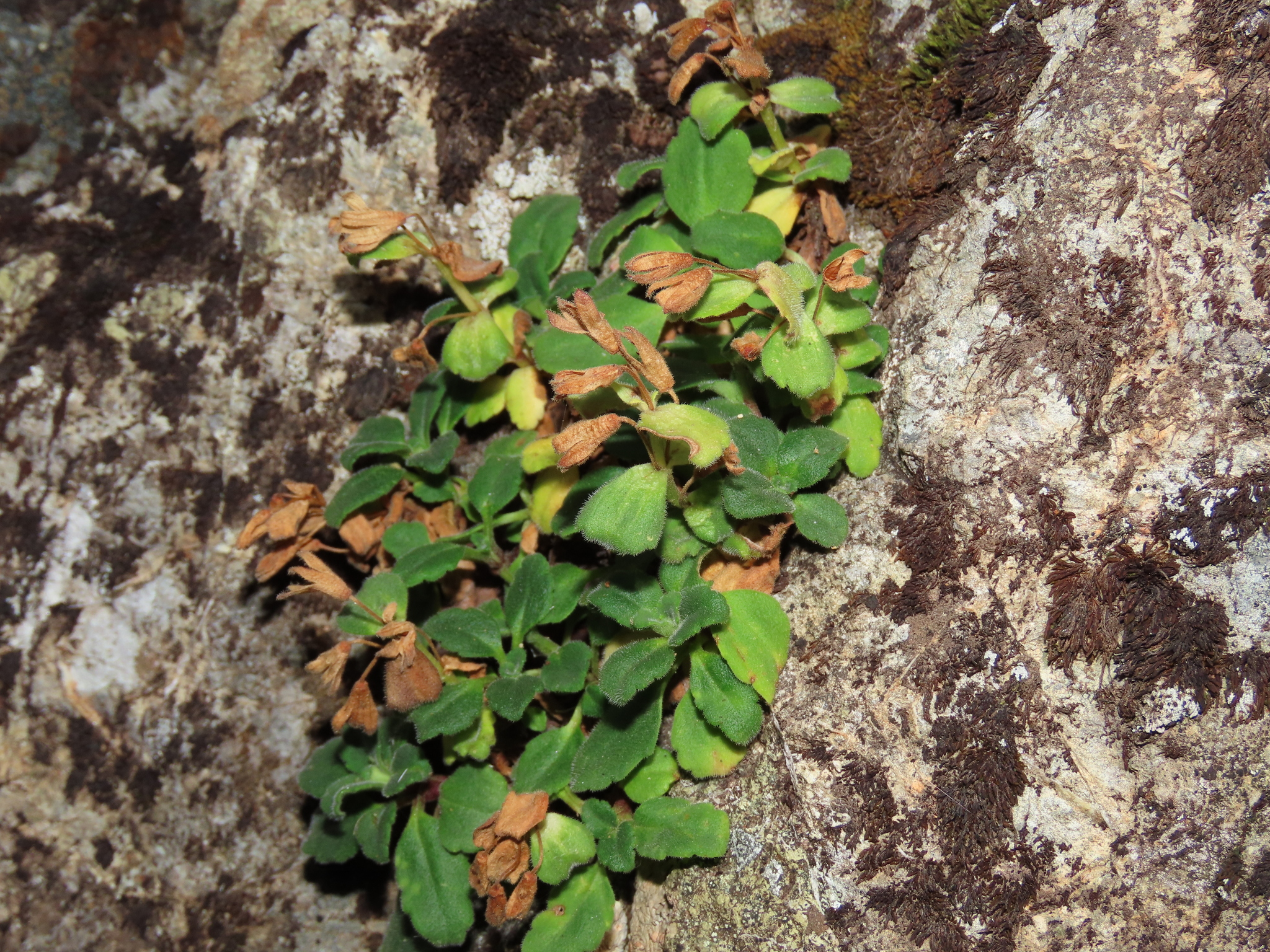
Fruiting plant with capsules

Ourisia fragrans is endemic to the Andes mountains of Argentina and Chile from approximately 39°S to 42°S latitude. It is found in the he Argentinean provinces of Neuquén and Río Negro (possibly also Chubut), as well as the Chilean region of Los Lagos, including multiple national parks. It can be found from 1300 to 2190 m above sea level in rocky habitats near the treeline, including outcrops, crevices and cliffs sometimes near running water.

== Phylogeny ==
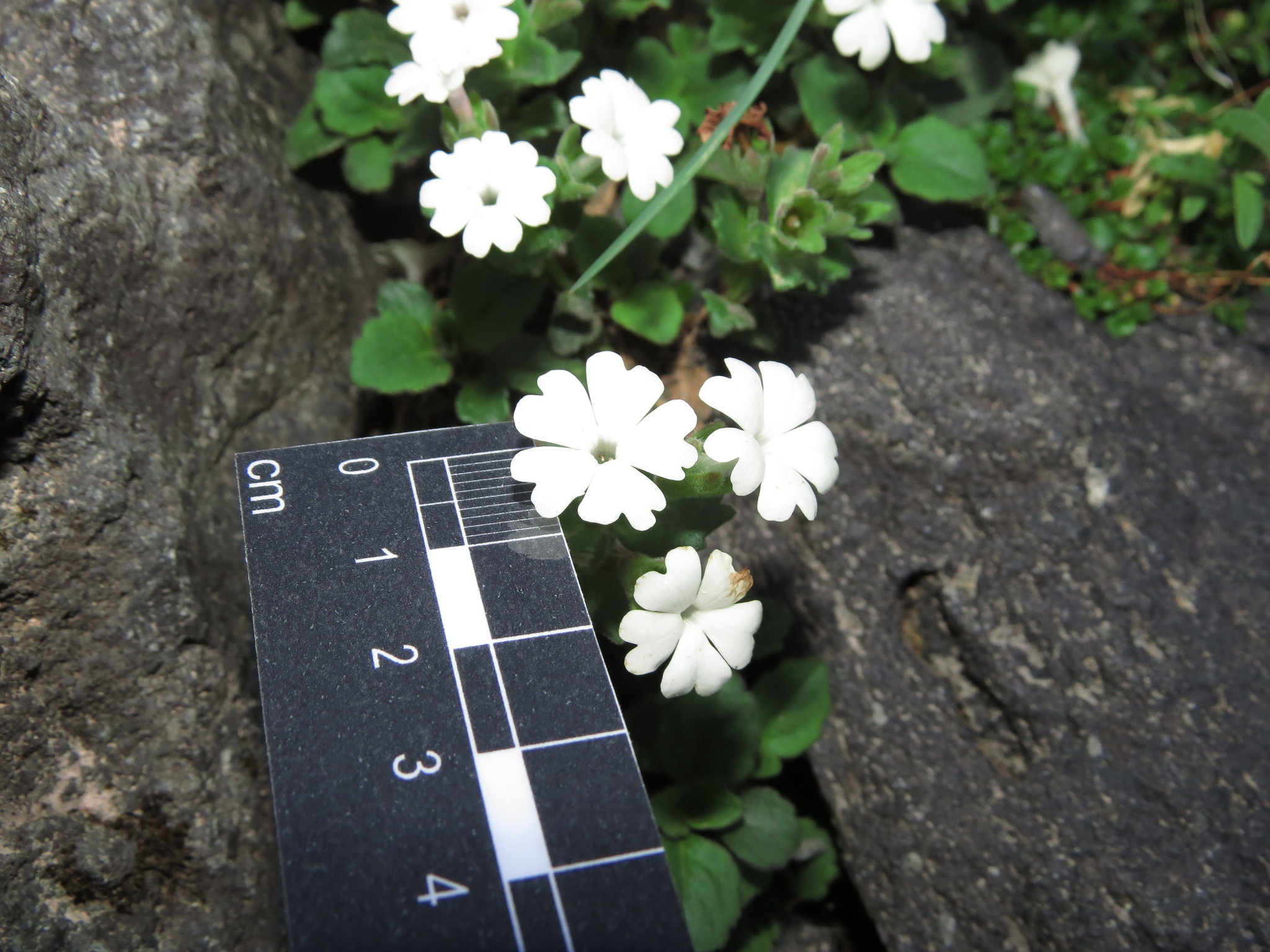
Close up of flowers with scale

One individual of Ourisia fragrans was included in a phylogenetic analysis of all species of the genus Ourisia, using standard DNA sequencing markers (two nuclear ribosomal DNA markers and two chloroplast DNA regions) and morphological data. O. fragrans was placed with high support in a clade of southern Andean herbaceous species, closely related to O. ruellioides and O. breviflora, both of which have overlapping geographic distributions with O. fragrans.
