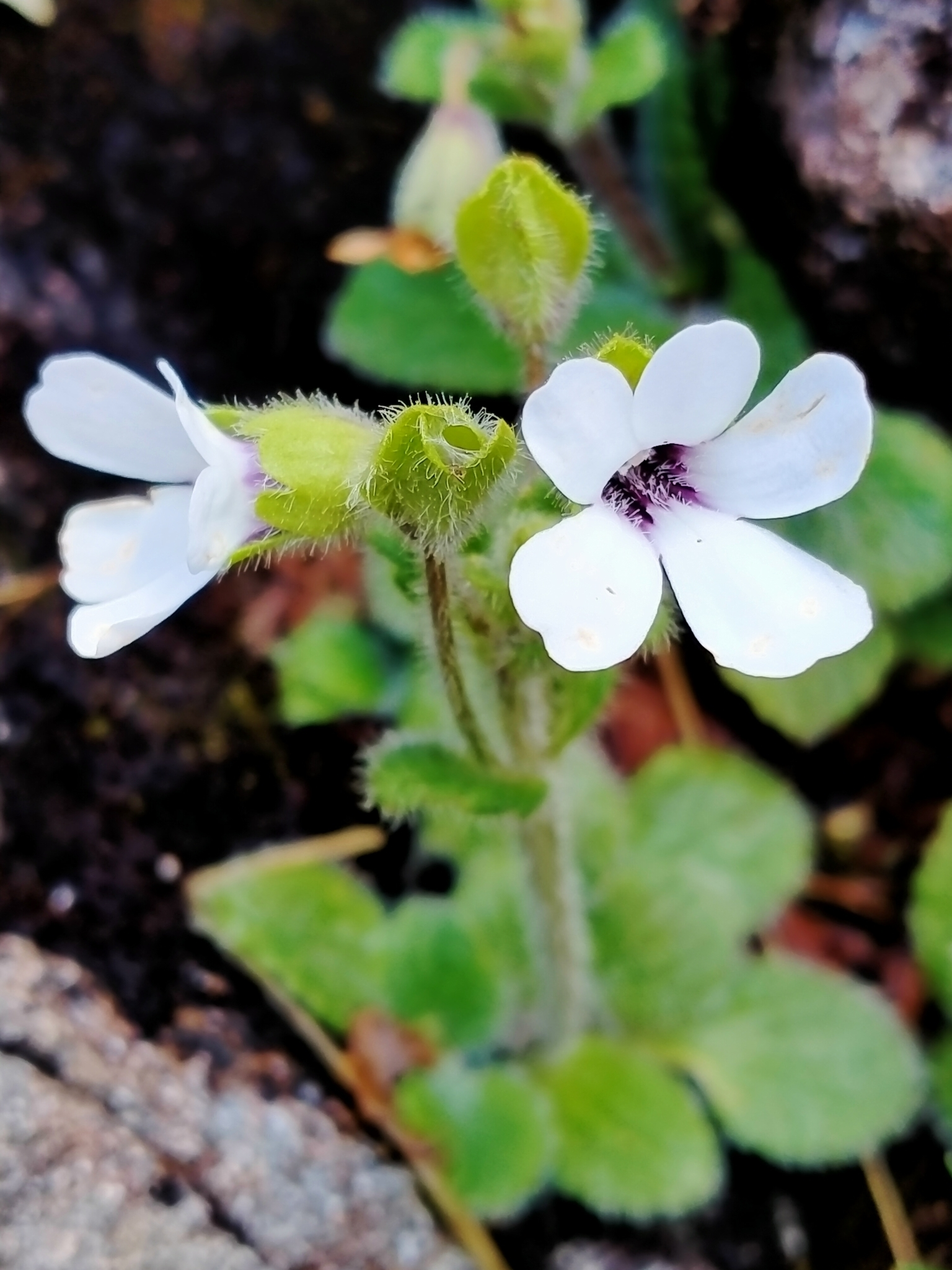
- Flowering O. remotifolia observed in Fiordland National Park, South Island, New Zealand

Conservation status
- Naturally Uncommon (NZ TCS)

Scientific classification
- Kingdom: Plantae
- Clade: Tracheophytes
- Clade: Angiosperms
- Clade: Eudicots
- Clade: Asterids
- Order: Lamiales
- Family: Plantaginaceae
- Genus: Ourisia
- Species: O. remotifolia

Binomial name
- Ourisia remotifolia Arroyo

= Ourisia remotifolia =

Species of flowering plant

Ourisia remotifolia is a species of flowering plant in the family Plantaginaceae that is endemic to high-elevation habitats in the South Island of New Zealand. Mary Kalin Arroyo described O. remotifolia in 1984. Plants of this species of New Zealand mountain foxglove are perennial, small-leaved herbs that are covered in a mixture of glandular and non-glandular hairs. They have hairy, crenate, ovate leaves that are oppositely arranged and tightly packed along the creeping stem. The flowers are single or in pairs in each node, with a zygomorphic calyx and corolla. The corolla is white and the corolla tube is purple inside with three lines of white hairs. It is listed as At Risk - Naturally Uncommon.

== Taxonomy ==
Ourisia remotifolia Arroyo is in the plant family Plantaginaceae. Mary Kalin Arroyo described O. remotifolia in 1984.

The type material was collected by Mary Kalin Arroyo at Gertrude Saddle, Fiordland National Park, South Island, New Zealand. The holotype is housed at the Allan Herbarium of Manaaki Whenua – Landcare Research.

Ourisia remotifolia is morphologically similar to other New Zealand small-leaved species, namely O. sessilifolia, with which it shares irregular white corollas that are purple inside with lines of white hairs, and having a mixture of glandular and non-glandular hairs on many plant parts.

O. remotifolia can be distinguished from O. sessilifolia by its lax, semi-erect, non-rosette habit (vs. erect rosette habit), leaves with long petioles that are widely spaced along the stem (vs. tightly packed rosettes), irregular calyces (vs. regular), flowers and bracts in pairs only (vs. sometimes in whorls), and all hairs the same length (vs. glandular hairs much shorter than non-glandular hairs).

== Description ==
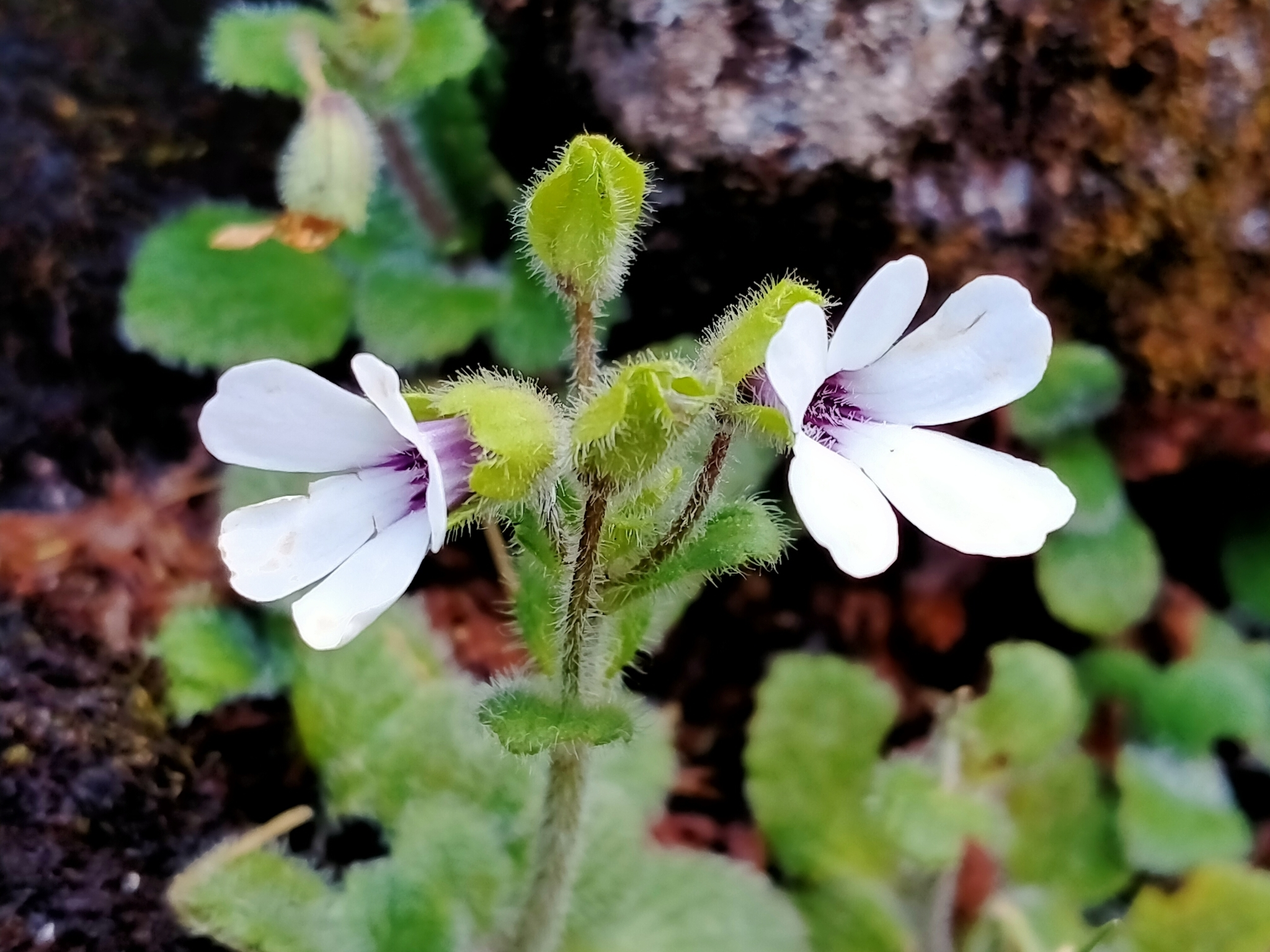
Close-up of flowers showing white corollas with purple inside the corolla tube, and mixture of glandular and non-glandular hairs on the calyx and pedicels

Ourisia remotifolia plants are perennial herbs. The stems are creeping, with opposite leaves that are tightly packed to tufted near the tip of the stem. Leaf petioles are 2.6–18.5 mm long. Leaf blades are 6.9–24.0 mm long by 6.9–20.3 mm wide (length: width ratio 1.0–1.2: 1), broadly to very broadly ovate, widest below the middle, with a rounded apex, usually cuneate base and regularly crenate edges. Leaves are densely hairy with a mixture of long glandular and non-glandular hairs on the upper surface, and densely hairy with short to long glandular hairs on the lower surface especially on the veins (sometimes glabrous), with prominent veins on the lower surface and sometimes punctate. Inflorescences are erect, densely hairy racemes up to 190 mm long, with a mixture of glandular and non-glandular hairs, and with 1–4 flowering nodes and up to 6 total flowers per raceme. Each flowering node has 1–2 flowers and 2 sessile, sometimes clasping bracts that are narrowly obovate or oblanceolate. The lowest bracts are similar to the leaves, 9.5–17.6 mm long and 5.3–9.1 mm wide, and become smaller toward the apex of the raceme. The flowers are borne on a densely hairy pedicel that is up to 21 mm long and has glandular hairs. The calyx is 5.7–7.7 mm long, irregular, with 3 lobes divided to one-quarter to one-half the length of the calyx and 2 divided to near the base, and densely hairy with a mixture of glandular and non-glandular hairs. The corolla is 12.5–17.7mm long (including the 4.6–8.1mm long corolla tube), bilabiate, tubular-funnelform, glabrous and white on the outside, and purple with 3 lines of white hairs on the inside. The corolla lobes are 3.6–9.2 mm long, spreading, and usually obcordate to obovate. There are 4 stamens up to 7.0 mm long which are didynamous, with two long stamens reaching the corolla tube opening or exserted, and 2 short stamens included inside the corolla; a short staminode 0.5–0.7 mm long is also present. The style is 3.0–4.9 mm long, exserted, with an emarginate stigma. The ovary is 2.2–3.1 mm long and glabrous. Fruits are capsules 3.9–6.5 mm long and 3.3–6.2 mm wide with loculicidal dehiscence and pedicels up to 27.0 mm long. The number of seeds in each capsule is unknown, and seeds are 0.7–1.1 mm long and 0.3–0.6 mm long, with a two-layered, reticulate seed coat.

Ourisia remotifolia flowers from December to January and fruits from January to April.

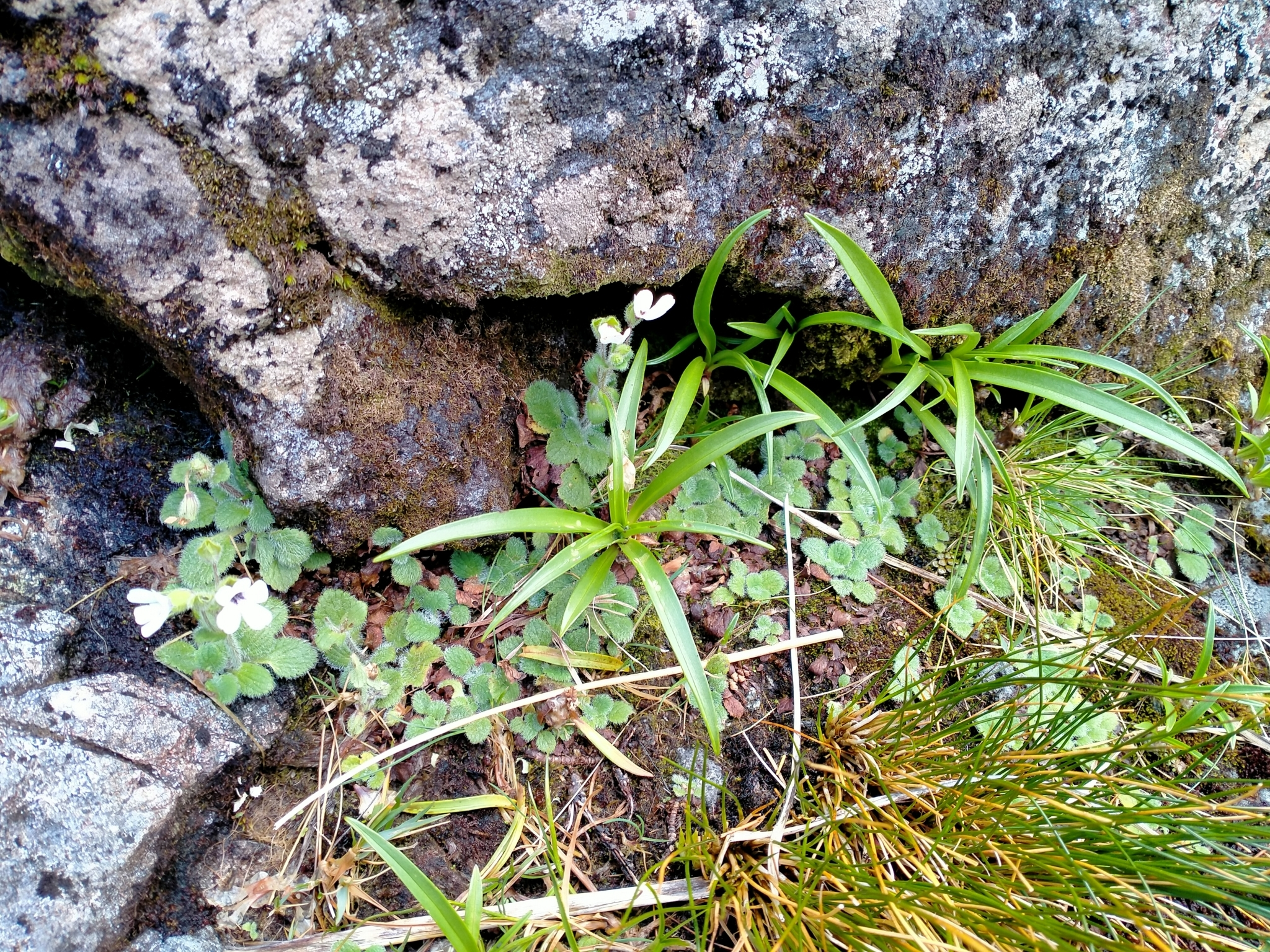
Habit and rocky alpine herbfield habitat of O. remotifolia

The chromosome number of Ourisia remotifolia is 2n=48.

== Distribution and habitat ==
Ourisia remotifolia is a New Zealand mountain foxglove that is endemic to the South Island of New Zealand. It is found only in the regions of Canterbury, Westland and Fiordland in high-elevation herbfields on bluffs, in sheltered hollows, or in rock crevices, and can be locally common, from 1,000 to 2,200 m (3,300 to 7,200 ft) above sea level.

== Phylogeny ==
An individual of O. remotifolia was included in phylogenetic analyses of all species of the genus Ourisia using standard DNA sequencing markers (two nuclear ribosomal DNA markers and two chloroplast DNA regions) and morphological data. In all analyses, the sampled individual belonged to the highly supported New Zealand lineage, and in the nuclear ribosomal and combined datasets, it was moderately to strongly supported as sister to O. macrocarpa. In the combined dataset, these two species were in a clade with O. sessilifolia and O. caespitosa.

In another phylogenetic study using amplified fragment length polymorphisms (AFLPs), all 12 sampled individuals formed a highly supported clade that was in turn moderately supported as being near the root of the tree with O. modesta. The 12 sampled individuals of O. remotifolia also comprised one of the significant clusters in the Bayesian clustering analysis.

== Conservation status ==
Ourisia remotifolia is listed as At Risk - Naturally Uncommon, with the qualifiers Range Restricted (RR) and Sparse (Sp) in the most recent assessment (2017–2018) of the New Zealand Threatened Classification for plants.
