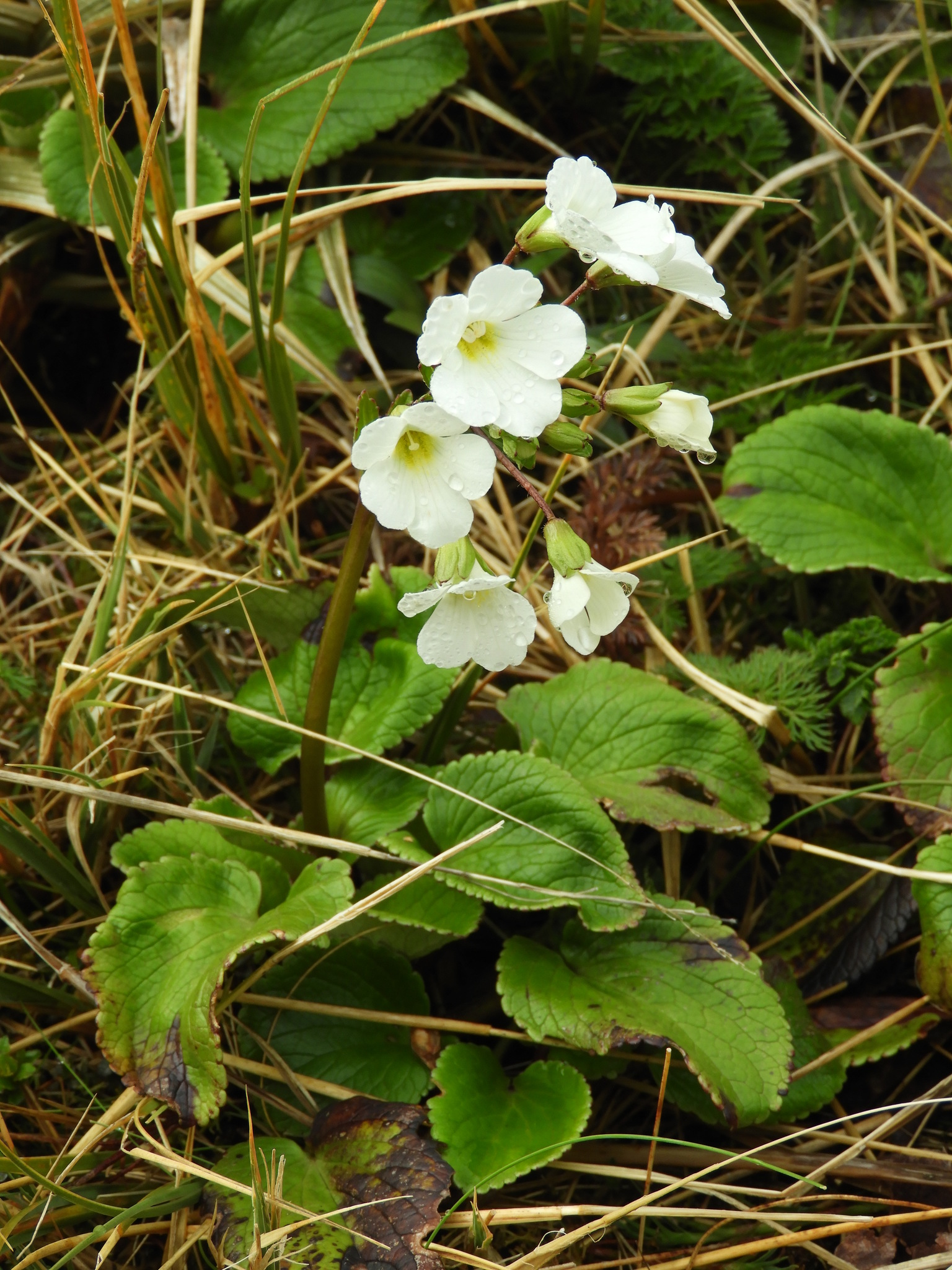
- Flowering O. macrocarpa plant observed in Fiordland National Park, New Zealand

Conservation status
- Not Threatened (NZ TCS)

Scientific classification
- Kingdom: Plantae
- Clade: Embryophytes
- Clade: Tracheophytes
- Clade: Spermatophytes
- Clade: Angiosperms
- Clade: Eudicots
- Clade: Asterids
- Order: Lamiales
- Family: Plantaginaceae
- Genus: Ourisia
- Species: O. macrocarpa

Binomial name
- Ourisia macrocarpa Hook.f.

Synonyms
- Ourisia macrocarpa var. cordata Cockayne

= Ourisia macrocarpa =

Species of flowering plant

Ourisia macrocarpa or snowy mountain foxglove is a species of flowering plant in the family Plantaginaceae that is endemic to the South Island of New Zealand. Joseph Dalton Hooker described O. macrocarpa in 1853. Plants of this species of New Zealand foxglove are showy, perennial, large-leaved, tufted, rhizomatous herbs that are mostly glabrous (hairless) or with some non-glandular hairs. They have broadly ovate leaves. The flowers are in whorls in each node, with an irregular calyx, a large, white irregular corolla, and fruits up to 1 cm long. The corolla tube is yellow with three lines of yellow hairs inside. It is listed as Not Threatened.

== Taxonomy ==
Ourisia macrocarpa Hook.f. is in the plant family Plantaginaceae. Joseph Dalton Hooker described O. macrocarpa in 1853. It is also known as snowy mountain foxglove.

The type material was collected by David Lyall from Dusky Bay, South Island, New Zealand. The holotype is housed at the herbarium at the Royal Botanical Gardens, Kew (K000979333).

Ourisia macrocarpa plants are large and showy perennials with whorls of flowers with large white corollas and large fruits (up to 1 cm long), characters they share with other New Zealand species O. calycina and O. macrophylla. Like O. macrocarpa, South American species O. coccinea and O. ruellioides are also large and showy with large fruits, but their flowers are in pairs instead of whorls in each node, and have red corollas.

Ourisia macrocarpa is morphologically most similar to another large-leaved New Zealand species, O. calycina. The two species were once treated as varieties of O. macrocarpa by both Leonard Cockayne and Lucy Moore, and Mary Kalin Arroyo treated them as subspecies. Although Heidi Meudt followed Arroyo's taxonomy in her monograph, a later phylogenetic study that showed that O. macrocarpa and O. calycina were not each other's closest relatives, which lead the authors to conclude that species rank would be more suitable.

A number of morphological differences also distinguish O. macrocarpa from O. calycina, including its broadly to very broadly ovate leaves (vs. narrowly to broadly ovate), rounded to cordate leaf bases (vs cuneate to truncate), petiole fringed with hairs on the lower portion only (vs fringed for its entire length), smooth calyx lobe edges (vs irregularly notched), irregular calyx (vs regular calyx), and glabrous peduncle (vs hairy). In addition, the two species are allopatric with O. macrocarpa found in southern South Island only, and O. calycina in northern and central South Island.

Ourisia macrocarpa can be distinguished from another large-leaved species, O. macrophylla, by its irregular calyx (vs. regular), and a lack of glandular hairs anywhere on the mostly hairless plants (vs. glandular hairs present at least on the pedicel and generally hairy plants).

== Description ==
Ourisia macrocarpa plants are large perennial herbs. The stems are creeping, with opposite leaves that are tightly tufted along the horizontal stem. Leaf petioles are 34.5–150.0 mm (1.36–5.91 in) long. Leaf blades are 12.3–135.1 mm (0.48–5.32 in) long by 7.4–71.4 mm (0.29–2.81 in) wide (length: width ratio 1.0–1.7: 1), broadly to very broadly ovate, widest below the middle, with an acute apex; rounded or cordate base; and regularly crenate edges. Leaves are mostly glabrous (hairless), with a fringe of non-glandular hairs on the lower edges only, and densely punctate on the lower surface, sometimes also with non-glandular hairs on the midvein. Inflorescences are erect, with usually glabrous racemes up to 61 cm (24 in) long, and with 1–8 flowering nodes and up to 32 or more total flowers per raceme. Each flowering node has up to 9 flowers and 3–9 sessile and clasping bracts that are usually lanceolate to narrowly ovate or oblanceolate to obovate. The lowest bracts are similar to the leaves, 12.2–24/- mm long and 3.9–10.2 mm wide, and become smaller toward the apex of the raceme. The flowers are borne on a glabrous or hairy pedicel that is up to 64.7 mm long and has non-glandular hairs only. The calyx is 7.5–12.2 mm long, irregular, with two lobes divided to the base and three lobes divided to one-half to two-thirds the calyx length, with a few non-glandular hairs to densely distributed hairs on the smooth edges and base. The corolla is 16.4–31.3 mm long (including the 5.7–16.1 mm long corolla tube), bilabiate, tubular-funnelform, glabrous and white (sometimes flushed pink) on the outside, and yellow and with three lines of yellow hairs on the inside. The corolla lobes are 5.9–15.3 mm long, spreading, and obovate or obcordate. There are 4 stamens up to 15.9 mm long which are didynamous, with two long stamens that are exserted, and 2 short stamens reaching the corolla tube opening; a short staminode 0.5–4.1 mm long is also present. The style is 5.5–10.7 mm long, exserted or reaching the corolla tube opening, with an emarginate stigma. The ovary is 3.0–4.6 mm long and glabrous. Fruits are capsules 5.0–9.9 mm long and 4.0–8.0 mm wide with loculicidal dehiscence and pedicels up to 80.5 mm long. There are c. 630 seeds in each capsule, and seeds are 0.4–1.3 mm long and 0.1–0.8 mm wide, with a two-layered, reticulate seed coat.

Ourisia macrocarpa flowers from December to February and fruits from December to March.

The chromosome number of Ourisia macrocarpa is 2n=48.

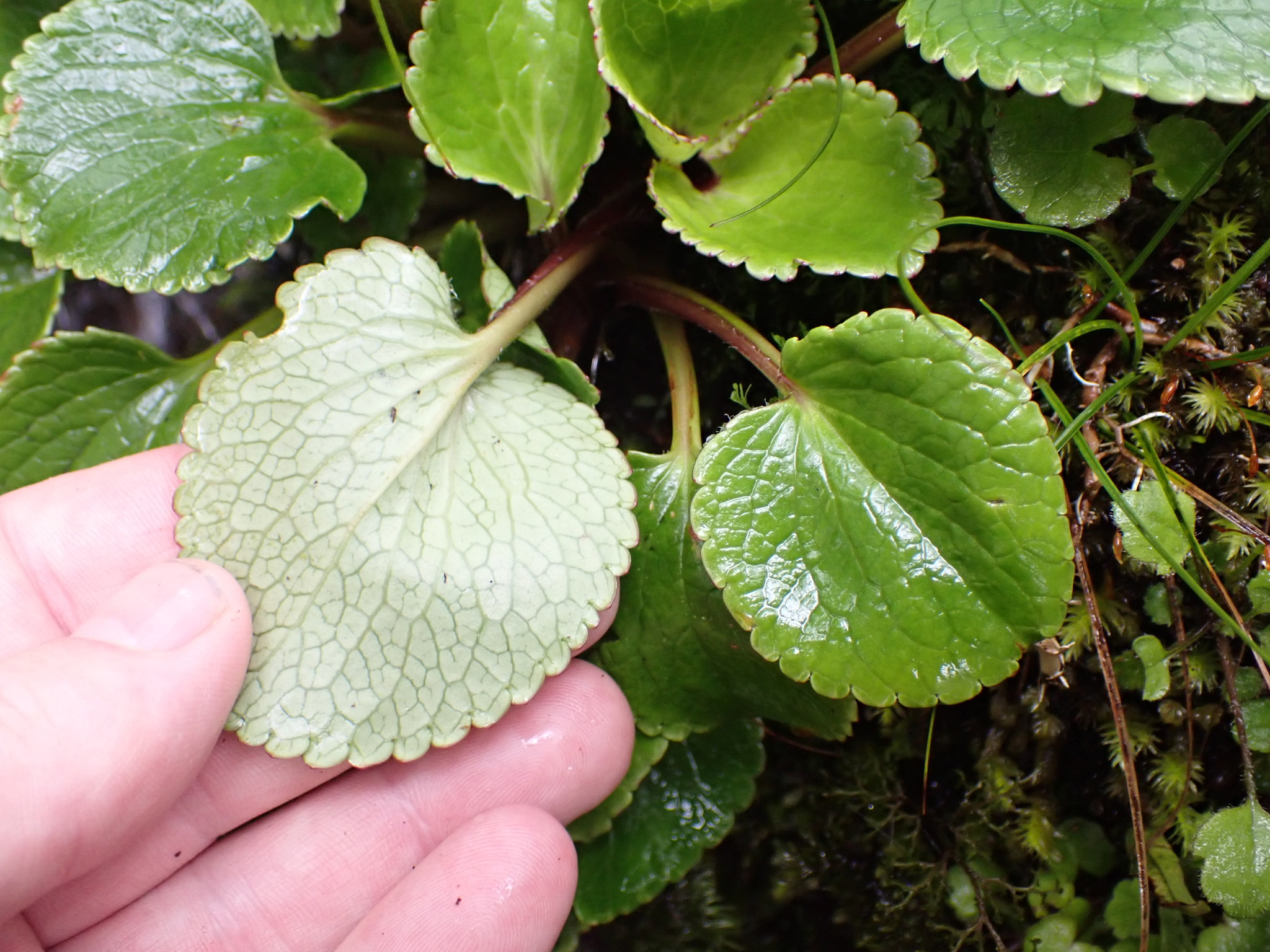
Underside of a leaf

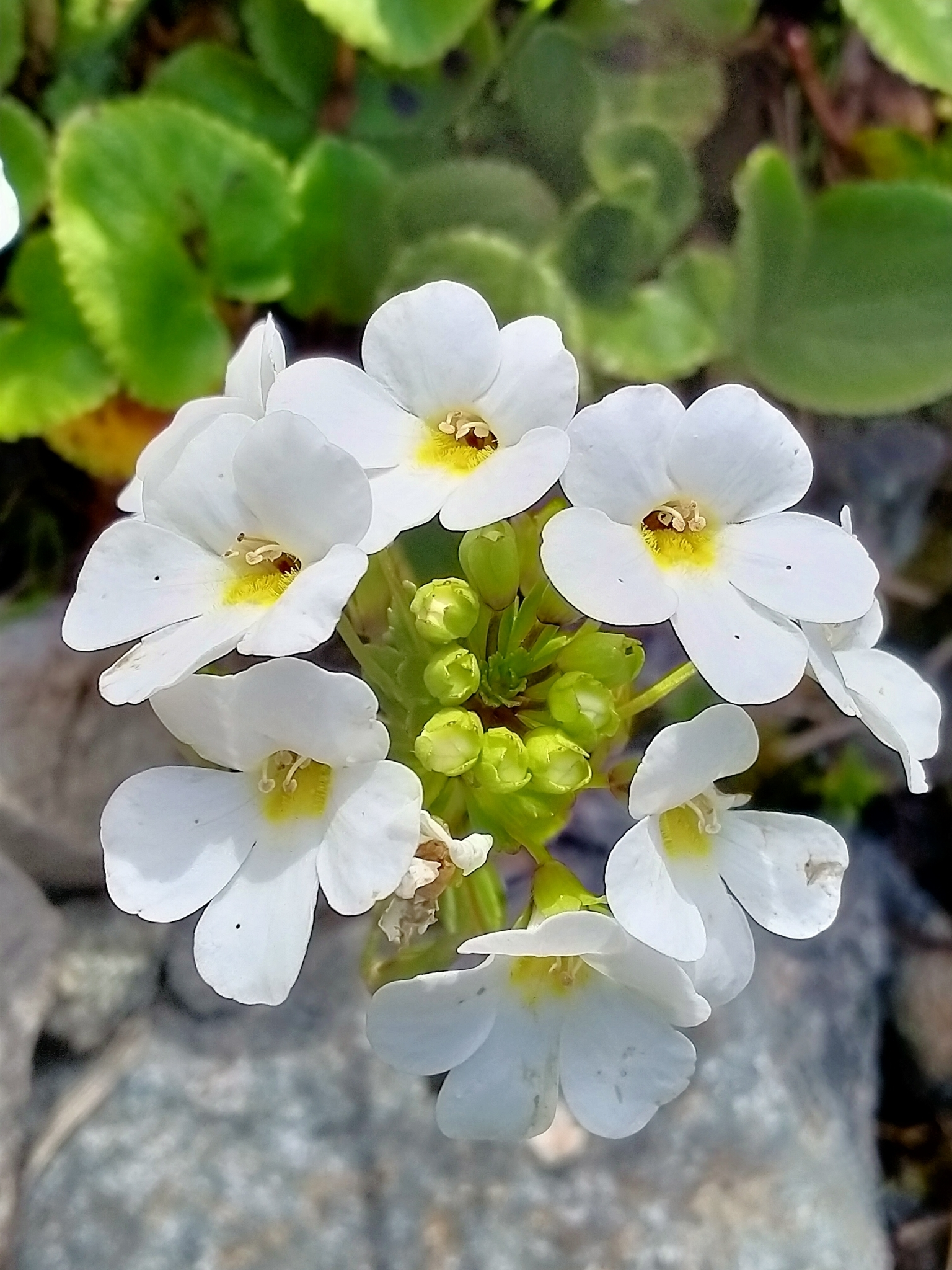
Close-up of flowers

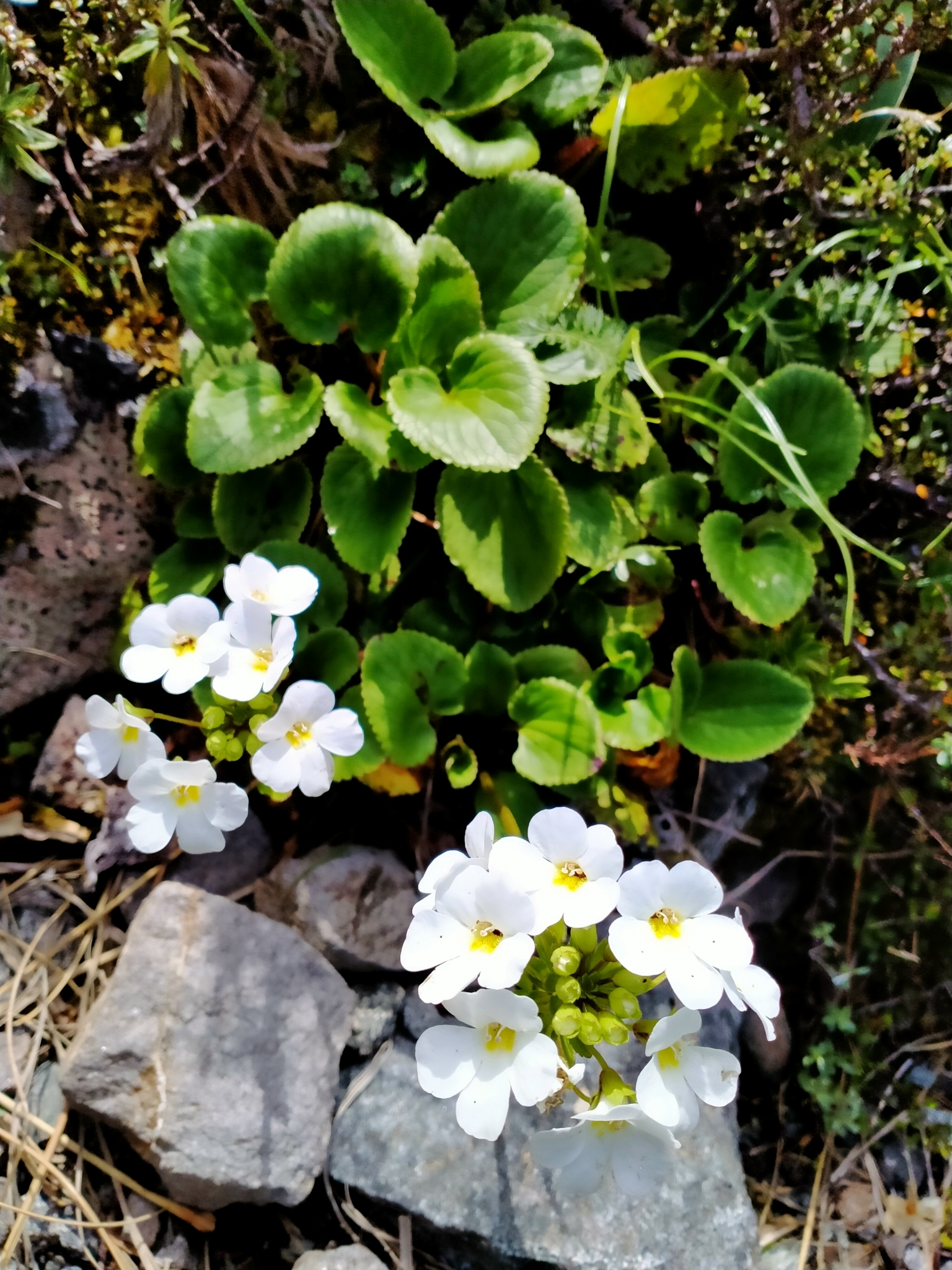
Flowering plants

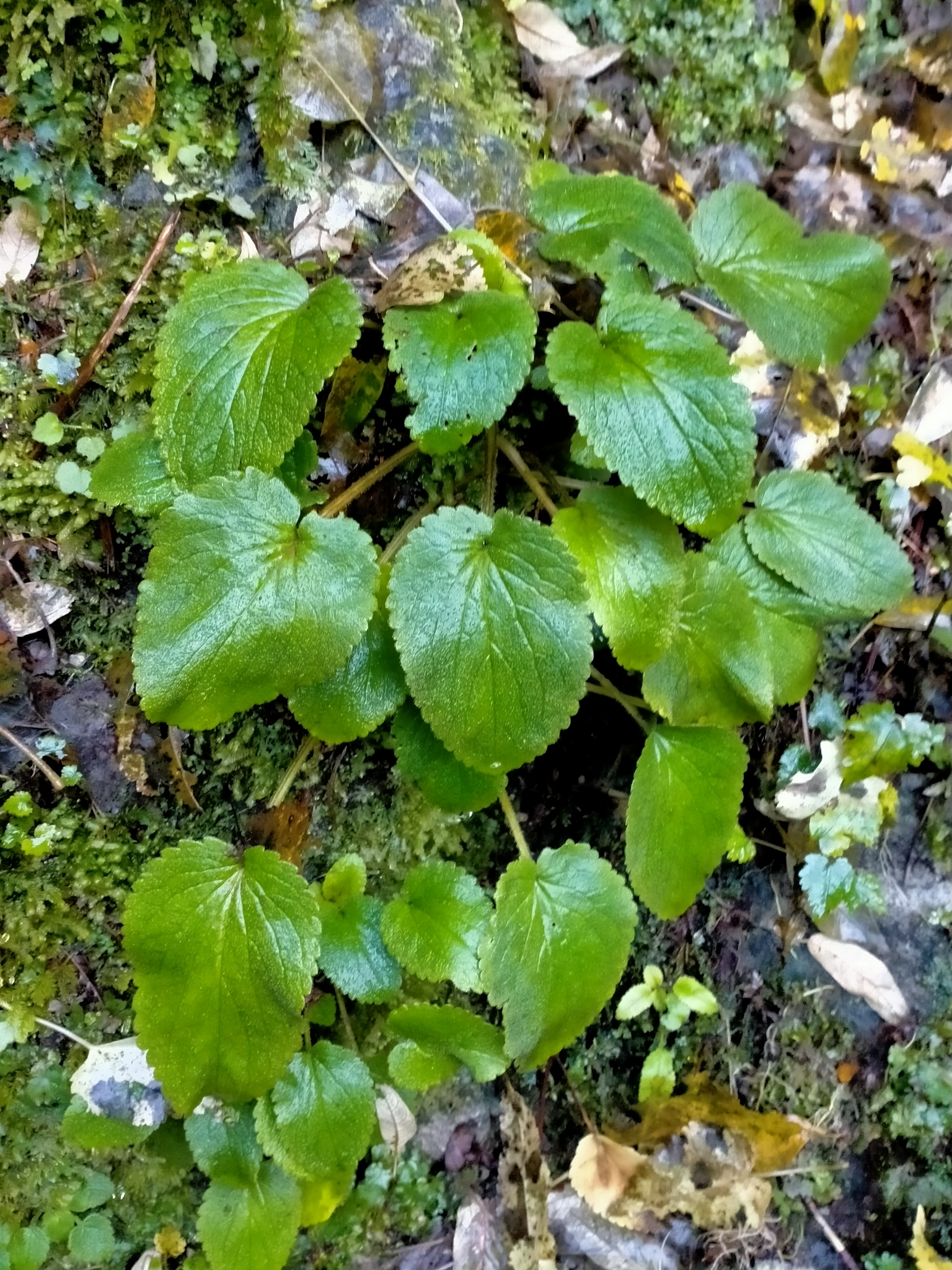
Leaves

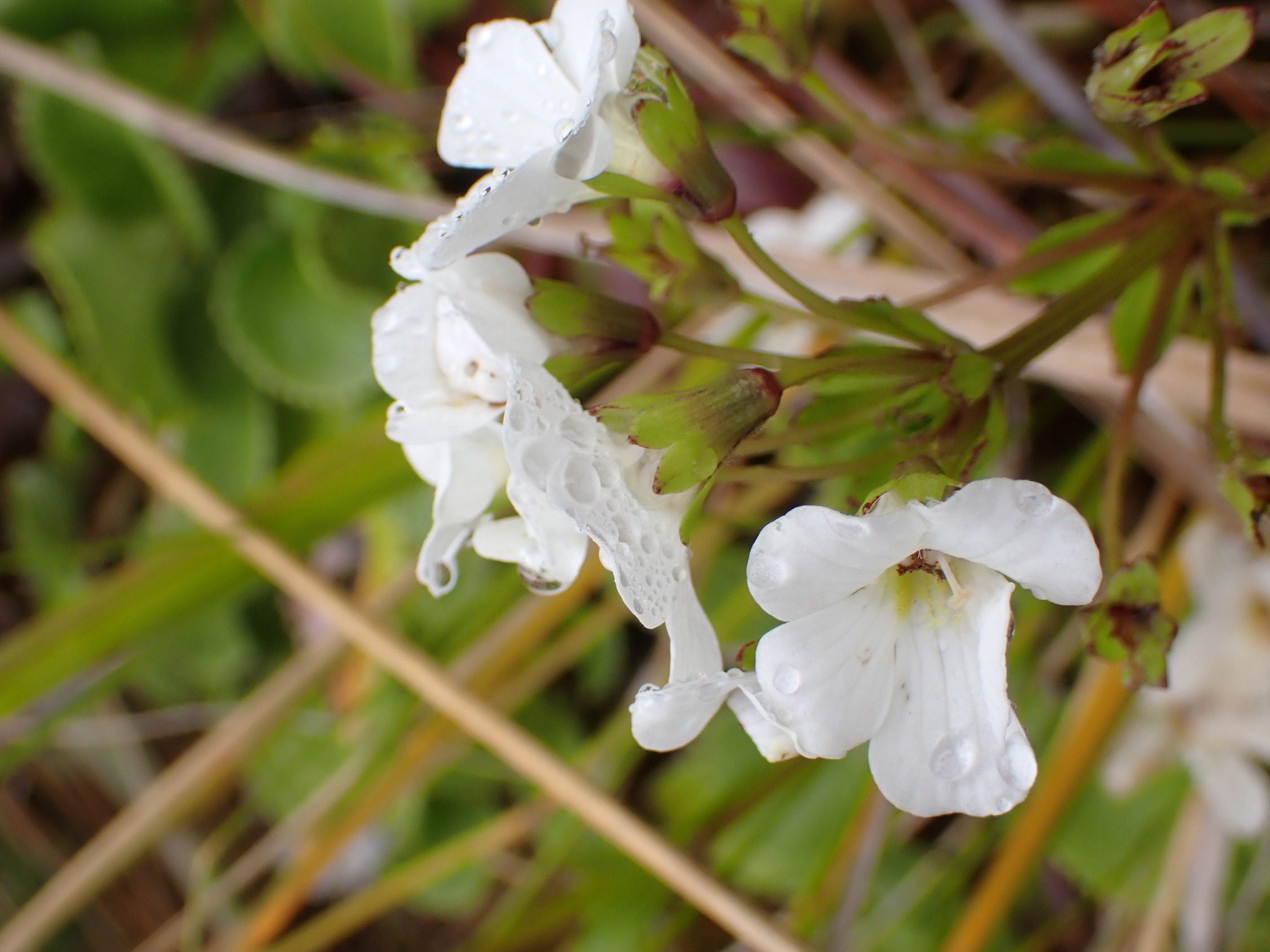
Flowers, showing irregular calyces

== Distribution and habitat ==
Ourisia macrocarpa is endemic to southern South Island, New Zealand, in Otago, Southland and Fiordland). It is found in subalpine herbfields, scrub, bogs and grasslands in wet habitats from 360 to 1,550 m (1,180 to 5,090 ft) above sea level.

== Phylogeny ==
One individual of O. macrocarpa was included in phylogenetic analyses of all species of the genus Ourisia using standard DNA sequencing markers (two nuclear ribosomal DNA markers and two chloroplast DNA regions) and morphological data. In all analyses, the sampled individual belonged to the highly supported New Zealand lineage, and in the nuclear ribosomal and combined datasets, it was moderately to strongly supported as sister to O. remotifolia. In the combined dataset, these two species were in a clade with O. sessilifolia and O. caespitosa.

In another phylogenetic study using amplified fragment length polymorphisms (AFLPs), all 11 sampled individuals of O. macrocarpa formed a highly supported clade that was sister to the rest of the large-leaved species, i.e. O. crosbyi, O. macrophylla, O. calycina and O. vulcanica. The 11 sampled individuals of O. macrocarpa also comprised one of the significant clusters in the Bayesian clustering analysis.

== Conservation status ==
Ourisia macrocarpa is listed as Not Threatened in the most recent assessment (2017–2018) of the New Zealand Threatened Classification for plants.
