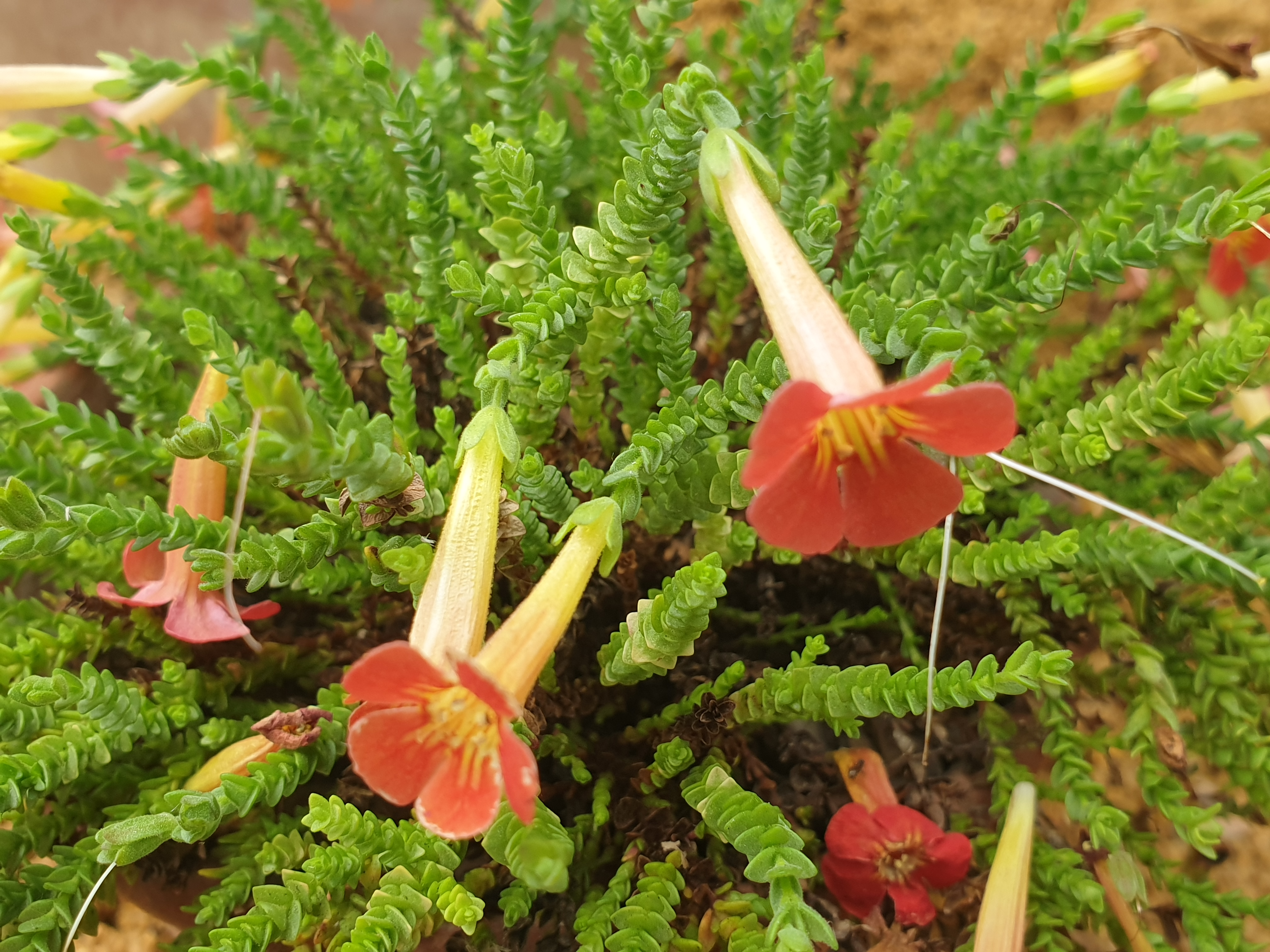
- Ourisia polyantha at the Cambridge University Botanic Garden, England

Scientific classification
- Kingdom: Plantae
- Clade: Tracheophytes
- Clade: Angiosperms
- Clade: Eudicots
- Clade: Asterids
- Order: Lamiales
- Family: Plantaginaceae
- Tribe: Angelonieae
- Genus: Ourisia; Comm. ex Juss.

Species
- See text

= Ourisia =

Genus of flowering plants

Ourisia is a genus of flowering plants of the family Plantaginaceae, native to Andean South America, Tasmania or New Zealand.

== Species ==
Species assigned to Ourisia include:

- Ourisia alpina
- Ourisia biflora
- Ourisia breviflora
- Ourisia caespitosa
- Ourisia calycina
- Ourisia chamaedrifolia
- Ourisia confertifolia
- Ourisia cotapatensis
- Ourisia coccinea
- Ourisia crosbyi
- Ourisia fragrans
- Ourisia fuegiana
- Ourisia glandulosa
- Ourisia integrifolia
- Ourisia macrocarpa
- Ourisia macrophylla
- Ourisia microphylla
- Ourisia modesta
- Ourisia muscosa
- Ourisia polyantha
- Ourisia pulchella
- Ourisia pygmaea
- Ourisia remotifolia
- Ourisia ruellioides
- Ourisia serpyllifolia
- Ourisia sessilifolia
- Ourisia simpsonii
- Ourisia spathulata
- Ourisia vulcanica
