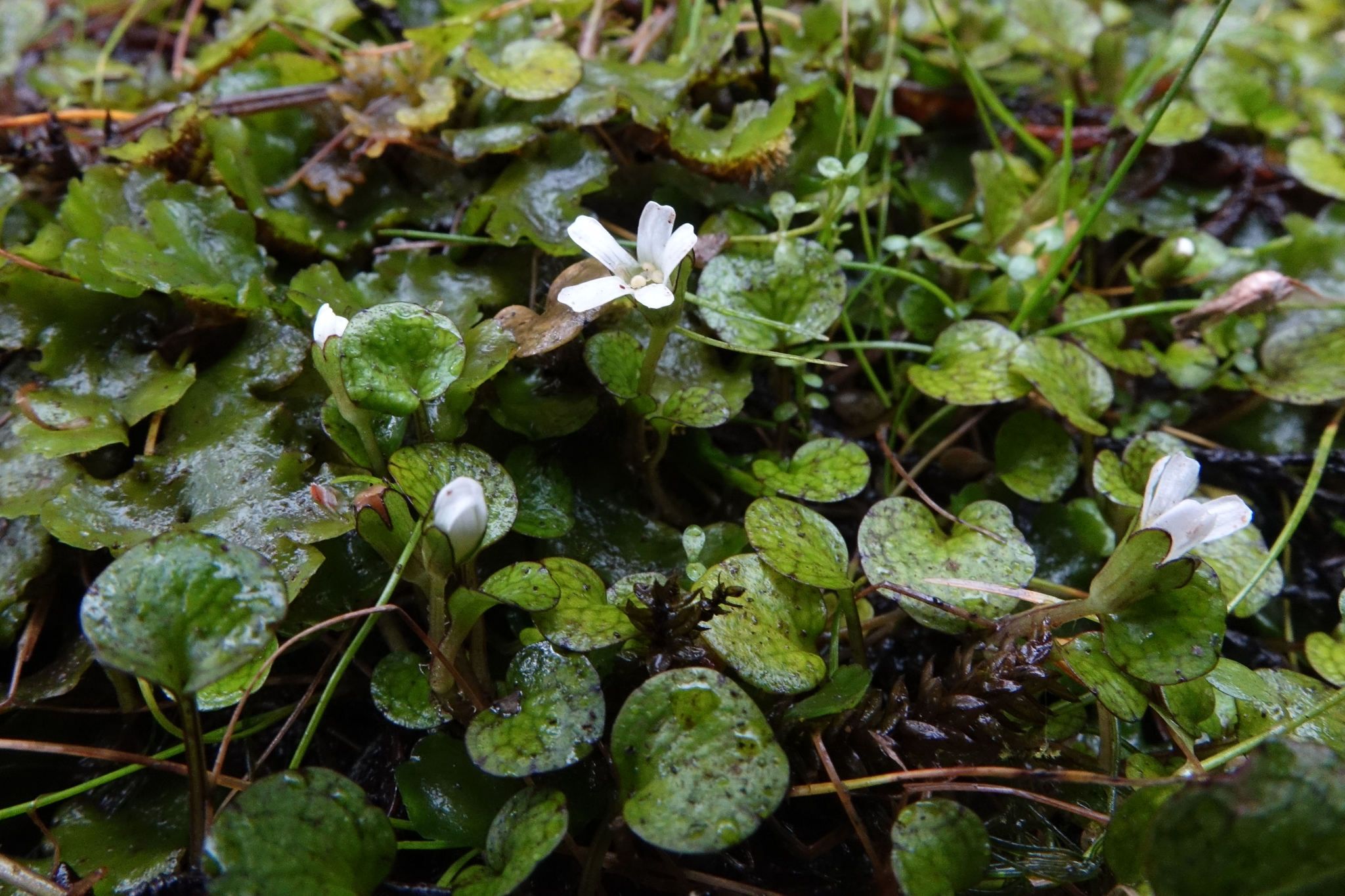
- Flowering O. modesta observed on Stewart Island, New Zealand

Conservation status
- Nationally Critical (NZ TCS)

Scientific classification
- Kingdom: Plantae
- Clade: Tracheophytes
- Clade: Angiosperms
- Clade: Eudicots
- Clade: Asterids
- Order: Lamiales
- Family: Plantaginaceae
- Genus: Ourisia
- Species: O. modesta

Binomial name
- Ourisia modesta Diels

= Ourisia modesta =

Species of flowering plant

Ourisia modesta or creeping foxglove is a species of flowering plant in the family Plantaginaceae that is endemic to New Zealand and was described by Ludwig Diels in 1909. Plants of this species are perennial, small-leaved, creeping herbs that are mostly glabrous (hairless). They have very broadly ovate to circular leaves that are opposite and widely spaced along a horizontal stem. The flowers are solitary in each node, with an irregular calyx and a small, white irregular corolla. The corolla tube has one line of hairs plus a ring of hairs inside. It is listed as Threatened - Nationally Critical in the New Zealand Threat Classification System.

== Taxonomy ==
Ourisia modesta Diels is in the plant family Plantaginaceae. Ludwig Diels described O. modesta in 1909. It is known as creeping foxglove.

The type material was collected by Leonard Cockayne from the Rakeahua Valley, Stewart Island, New Zealand. The holotype was housed at the herbarium in Berlin was destroyed during World War II. A neotype was designated by Heidi Meudt which is housed at the Manaaki Whenua - Landcare Research Allan Herbarium.

Ourisia modesta is unique among all other New Zealand mountain foxglove species in its very small size, mostly hairless aspect, opposite, and very broadly ovate to circular leaves that are widely separated along a creeping stem. Furthermore, its flowers are solitary in each node, and inflorescences only have one or two flowering nodes. The flowers have irregular calyces and irregular corollas that are very small (less than 9 mm long). Inside each corolla is one line of hairs plus a ring of hairs near the corolla tube opening.

O. modesta also has a unique seed coat, in which the primary reticulum is thick with rope-like intertwined cell walls and there is no secondary reticulum, whereas all other New Zealand seeds examined have a deep, thin, wing-like, non-intertwined primary reticulum, and a two-layered reticulum.

In some aspects, O. modesta is morphologically more similar to South American species of Ourisia rather than New Zealand species.

== Description ==
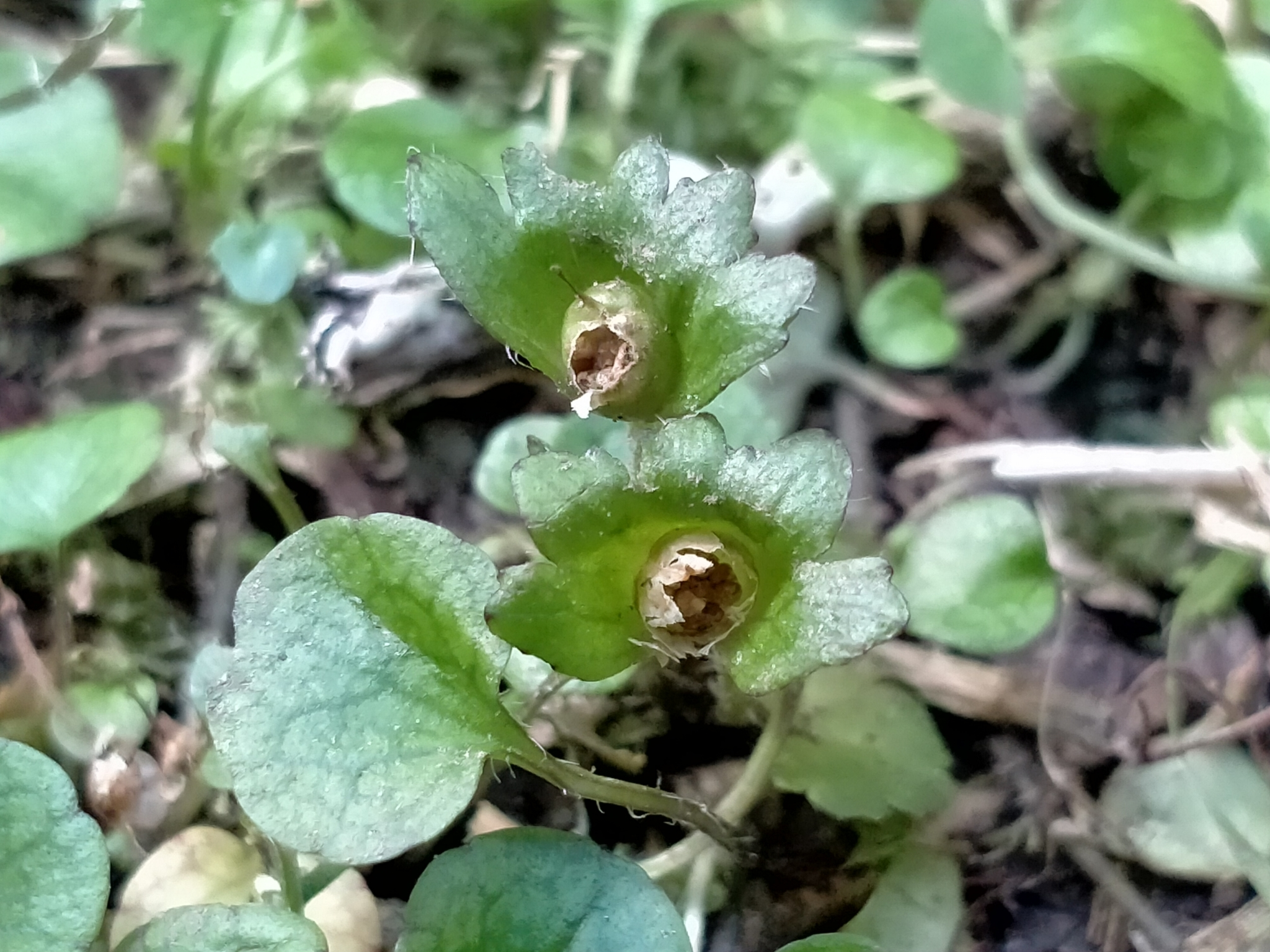
Fruits of O. modesta

Ourisia modesta plants are small perennial herbs. The stems are creeping, with opposite leaves that are widely spaced along the horizontal stem. Leaf petioles are 4.5–33.7 mm long. Leaf blades are 4.0–14.9 mm long by 4.6–12.3 mm wide (length: width ratio 0.8–1.1: 1), very broadly ovate or circular, widest at or below the middle, with a rounded apex, truncate or slightly cordate base and smooth or irregularly notched edges. Leaves are mostly glabrous (hairless), rarely with a few non-glandular hairs on the upper surface, and densely punctate on the lower surface. Inflorescences are ascending, with hairy racemes (sometimes densely hairy) up to 90 mm long, with non-glandular hairs, and with 1–2 flowering nodes and up to 2 total flowers per raceme. Each flowering node has 1 flower and 2 sessile, petiolate to sessile bracts that are usually broadly to very broadly ovate. The lowest bracts are similar to the leaves, 3.7–9.3 mm long and 3.9–9.3 mm wide, and become smaller toward the apex of the raceme. The flowers are borne on a sparsely hairy pedicel that is up to 15.8 mm long and has non-glandular hairs only. The calyx is 3.7–8.2 mm long, irregular, with two lobes divided to the base and three lobes divided to one-quarter to one-third the calyx length, often glabrous or sometimes with non-glandular hairs. The corolla is 6.6–9.0 mm long (including the 3.3–6.3 mm long corolla tube), bilabiate, tubular-funnelform, glabrous and white on the outside, and white and with one line plus a ring of white hairs on the inside. The corolla lobes are 1.7–3.5 mm long, slightly spreading, and obcordate. There are 4 stamens up to 9.6 mm long which are didynamous, with two long stamens reaching the corolla tube opening, and 2 short stamens included inside the corolla; a short staminode 0.3–0.4 mm long is also present. The style is 2.2–3.9 mm long, not exserted, with a capitate or emarginate stigma. The ovary is 1.5–2.3 mm long and glabrous. Fruits are capsules 4.4–5.2 mm long and 4.2–6.0 mm wide with loculicidal dehiscence and pedicels up to 31.3 mm long. The number of seeds in each capsule is unknown, and seeds are 0.7–0.8 mm long and 0.5–0.7 mm long, with a one-layered reticulate seed coat.

Ourisia modesta flowers from December to January and fruits from January to February.

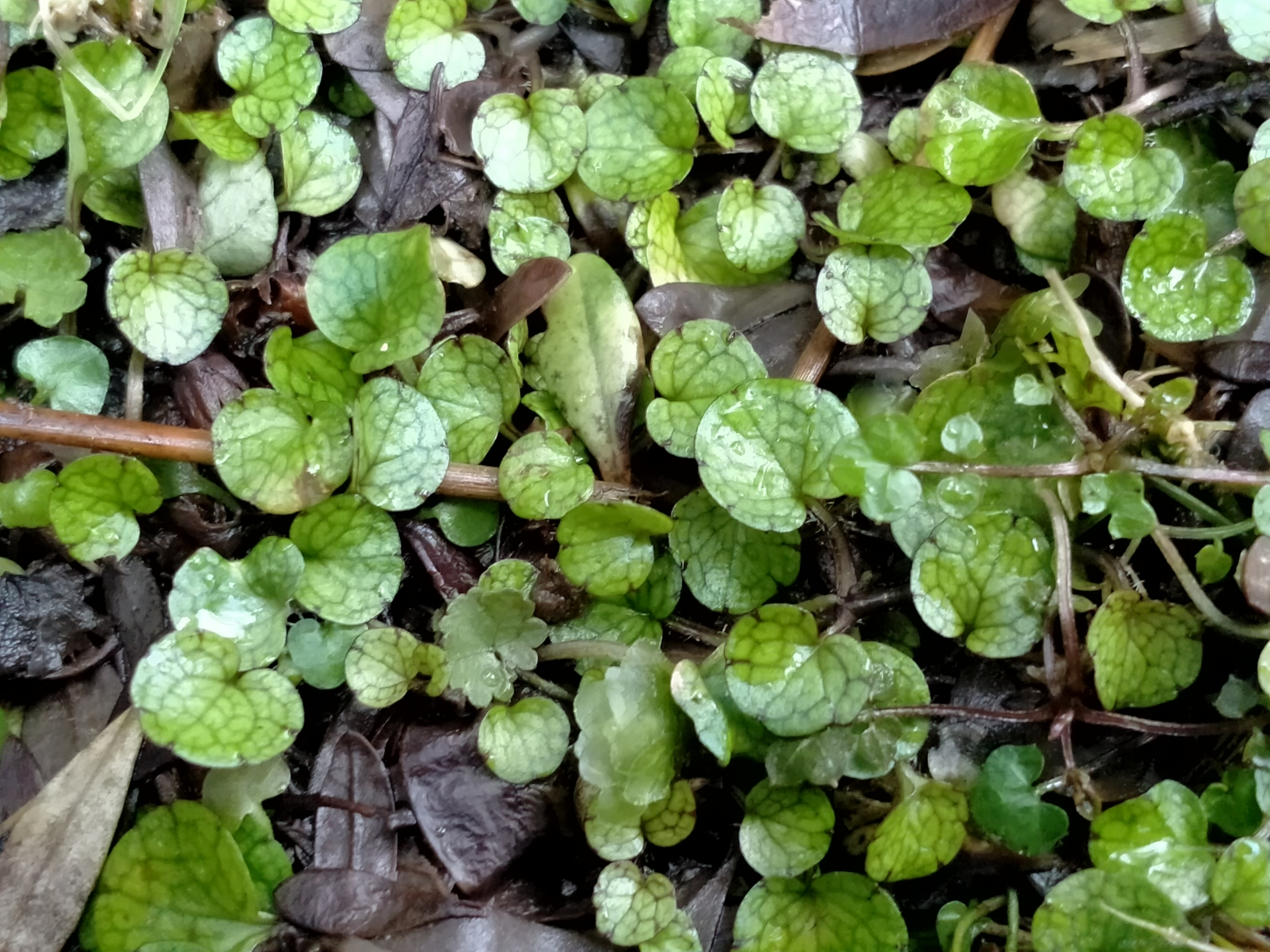
Close up of the mostly hairless, opposite, circular leaves of O. modesta

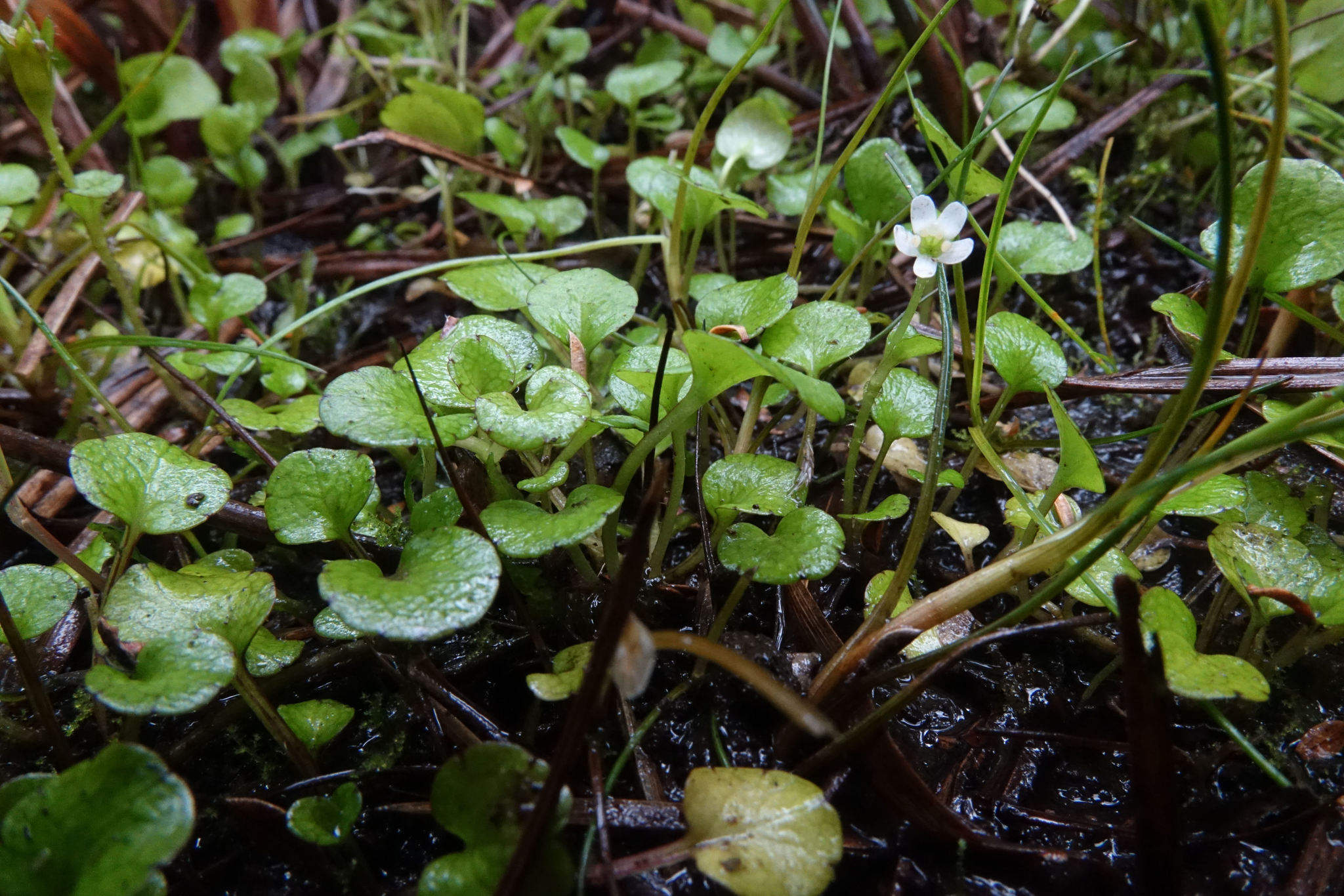
Plants of O. modesta in a typically wet habitat

The chromosome number of Ourisia modesta is 2n=48.

== Distribution and habitat ==
Ourisia modesta is endemic to New Zealand. It is known from few populations that are disjunct in the North Island (Ruahine Range), South Island (Western Nelson and Southland) and Stewart Island, on flats or in forest, in moist hollows, near streams, and in bogs or wet sites that occasionally experience flooding, from sea level to 500 m (1,600 ft) above sea level.

== Phylogeny ==
Two individuals of O. modesta were included in phylogenetic analyses of all species of the genus Ourisia using standard DNA sequencing markers (two nuclear ribosomal DNA markers and two chloroplast DNA regions) and morphological data. In the nuclear and combined molecular analyses, the sampled individuals were sister to one another and belonged to the highly supported New Zealand lineage, but their placement was not well resolved within that clade in any of the trees.

In another phylogenetic study using amplified fragment length polymorphisms (AFLPs), all seven sampled individuals of O. modesta formed a highly supported clade that was sometimes placed with other small-leaved New Zealand species of Ourisia, or paired with the Tasmanian species, O. integrifolia, or sister to all other New Zealand Ourisia. The seven sampled individuals of O. modesta also comprised one of the significant clusters in the Bayesian clustering analysis.

== Conservation status ==
Ourisia modesta is the smallest and one of the least common species of the genus in New Zealand. It is listed as Threatened - Nationally Critical with the qualifiers DP (data poor), PD (partial decline), and Sp (Sparse) in the most recent assessment (2017–2018) of the New Zealand Threatened Classification for plants.
