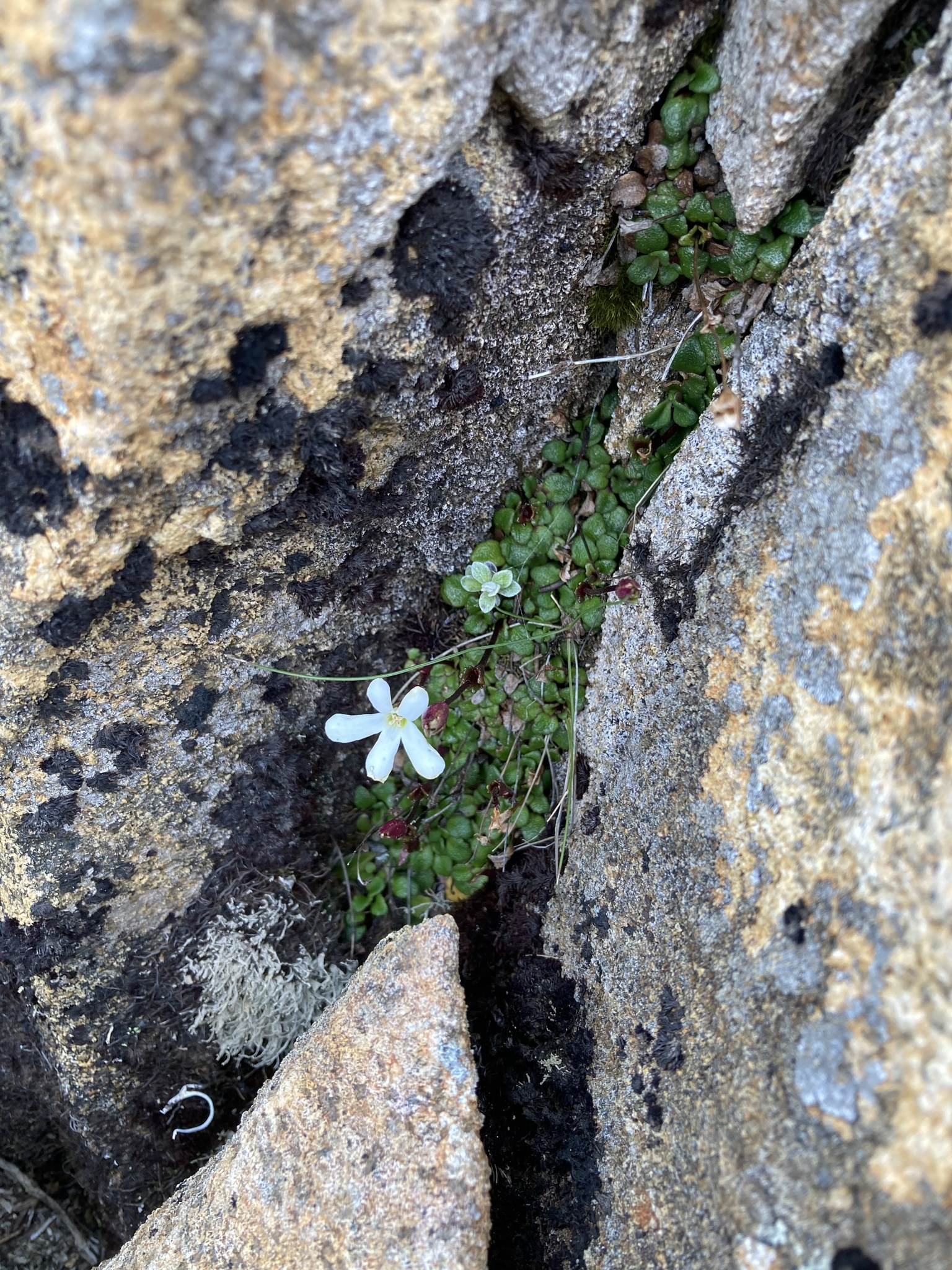
- Ourisia integrifolia plant observed at Mt Field National Park, Tasmania, Australia

Scientific classification
- Kingdom: Plantae
- Clade: Tracheophytes
- Clade: Angiosperms
- Clade: Eudicots
- Clade: Asterids
- Order: Lamiales
- Family: Plantaginaceae
- Genus: Ourisia
- Species: O. integrifolia

Binomial name
- Ourisia integrifolia (R.Br.)
- Range of O. integrifolia (precise locations only)

= Ourisia integrifolia =

Species of flowering plant

Ourisia integrifolia or mountain whitebell is a species of flowering plant in the family Plantaginaceae that is endemic to Tasmania, Australia. Robert Brown described O. integrifolia in 1810. Plants of this species of Australian foxglove are showy, perennial, rhizomatous herbs that are mostly glabrous but can have some non-glandular hairs. They have crenate or notched, ovate to broadly ovate leaves. The flowers are usually single or in pairs in each node in the inflorescence, with a regular calyx, and a white sub-regular corolla. The corolla tube is yellow with and glabrous inside.

== Taxonomy ==
Ourisia integrifolia R.Br. is in the plant family Plantaginaceae. Robert Brown described O. integrifolia in 1810 in his Prodromus. It is also known as mountain whitebell.

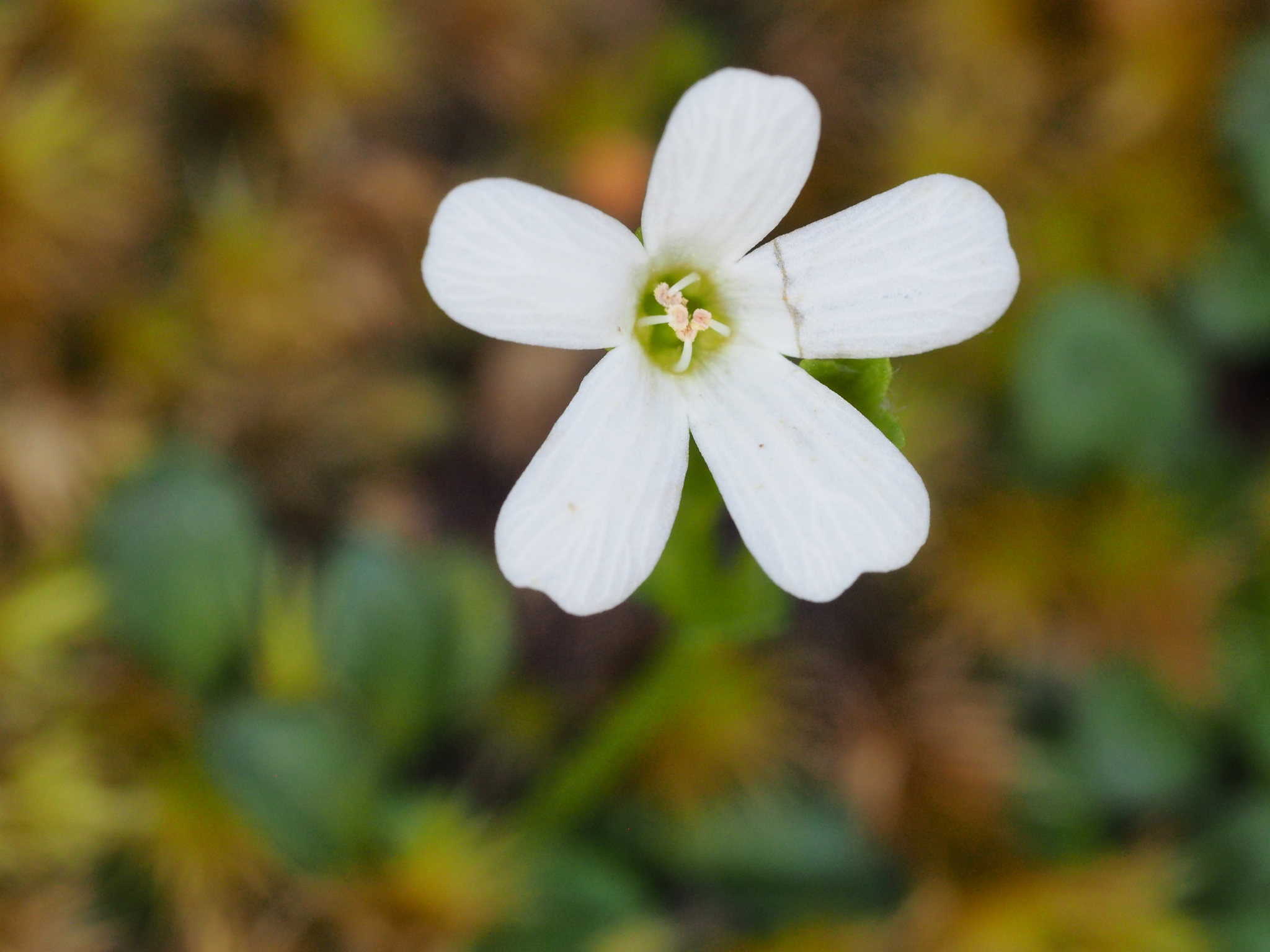
Close-up of sub-regular white corolla

The type material was collected by Robert Brown in 1804 at "Table Mountain" (Mt Wellington). The lectotype and an isolectotype are housed at Herbarium BM at the Natural History Museum, London.

Ourisia integrifolia plants are mostly glabrous (hairless) to perennials with short inflorescences that have one or two flowers per node, a regular calyx with hairs along the edges of the lobes, and white sub-regular corollas that are glabrous inside the corolla tube.

O. integrifolia shares some characteristics with the South American species of Ourisia, and other characteristics of the New Zealand species. For example, its white corollas are similar to all New Zealand species and a few South American species, whereas its sub-regular corolla is shared with a few South American species. It has a glabrous corolla tube like most South American species and a few New Zealand species (O. glandulosa, O. simpsonii, O. spathulata and O. confertifolia). Finally, the seeds of O. integrifolia are the second largest in the genus at 1.1 to 1.7 mm long, and are morphologically similar to the seeds of the South American herbaceous species of Ourisia.

== Description ==
Ourisia integrifolia plants are perennial sub-rosette herbs. The stems are creeping, with opposite leaves that are tightly tufted along the horizontal stem. Leaf petioles are 2.5–24.3 mm long. Leaves are 2.3–14.5 mm long by 1.6–11.0 mm wide (length: width ratio 1.1–1.5: 1). Lamina is usually ovate to broadly ovate, widest below the middle, with a rounded apex, cuneate base, and notched or crenate edges. Leaves are glabrous or with few non-glandular hairs on the upper surface near the edges and petiole, and punctate on the lower surface. Inflorescences are erect, with racemes mostly glabrous but sometimes with a few non-glandular hairs, up to 17.5 cm long, and with 1–2 flowering nodes and up to 3 total flowers per raceme. Each flowering node has up to 2 flowers and 2 sessile and sometimes clasping bracts that are usually oblanceolate to narrowly obovate, and glabrous or hairy with non-glandular hairs near the edges. The lowest bracts are similar to the leaves, 4.1–9.3 mm long and 2.2–4.6 mm wide, and become smaller toward the apex of the raceme. The flowers are borne on a mostly glabrous pedicel that is up to 46.6 mm long and may have a few non-glandular hairs near the calyx. The calyx is 5.6–6.8 mm long, regular, all lobes divided nearly to the base, glabrous or with isolated to sparsely distributed non-glandular hairs. The corolla is 8.7–13.0 mm long (including the 2.0–5.0 mm long corolla tube), sub-regular (not strongly bilabiate), tubular-funnelform, glabrous and white or pale bluish on the outside, and yellow to greenish-yellow and glabrous on the inside. The corolla lobes are 5.3–8.5 mm long, spreading, and obovate to obcordate. There are 4 stamens up to 6.0 mm long which are didynamous, with two long stamens that are usually reaching the corolla tube opening, and two short stamens that are also usually reaching the corolla tube opening; a short staminode 0.7–1.2 mm long is also present. The style is 1.2–1.7mm long, included, with an emarginate stigma. The ovary is 2.1–3.0 mm long and usually glabrous. Fruits are capsules 5.7–7.1mm long and 4.0–5.7 mm wide with loculicidal dehiscence and pedicels up to 6.5 cm (2.6 in) long. It is unknown how many seeds are in each capsule, and seeds are 1.1–1.7 mm long and 0.6–1.1 mm wide, with a two-layered, reticulate seed coat.

Ourisia integrifolia flowers from December to February and fruits from January to March.

The chromosome number of Ourisia integrifolia is 2n=32.

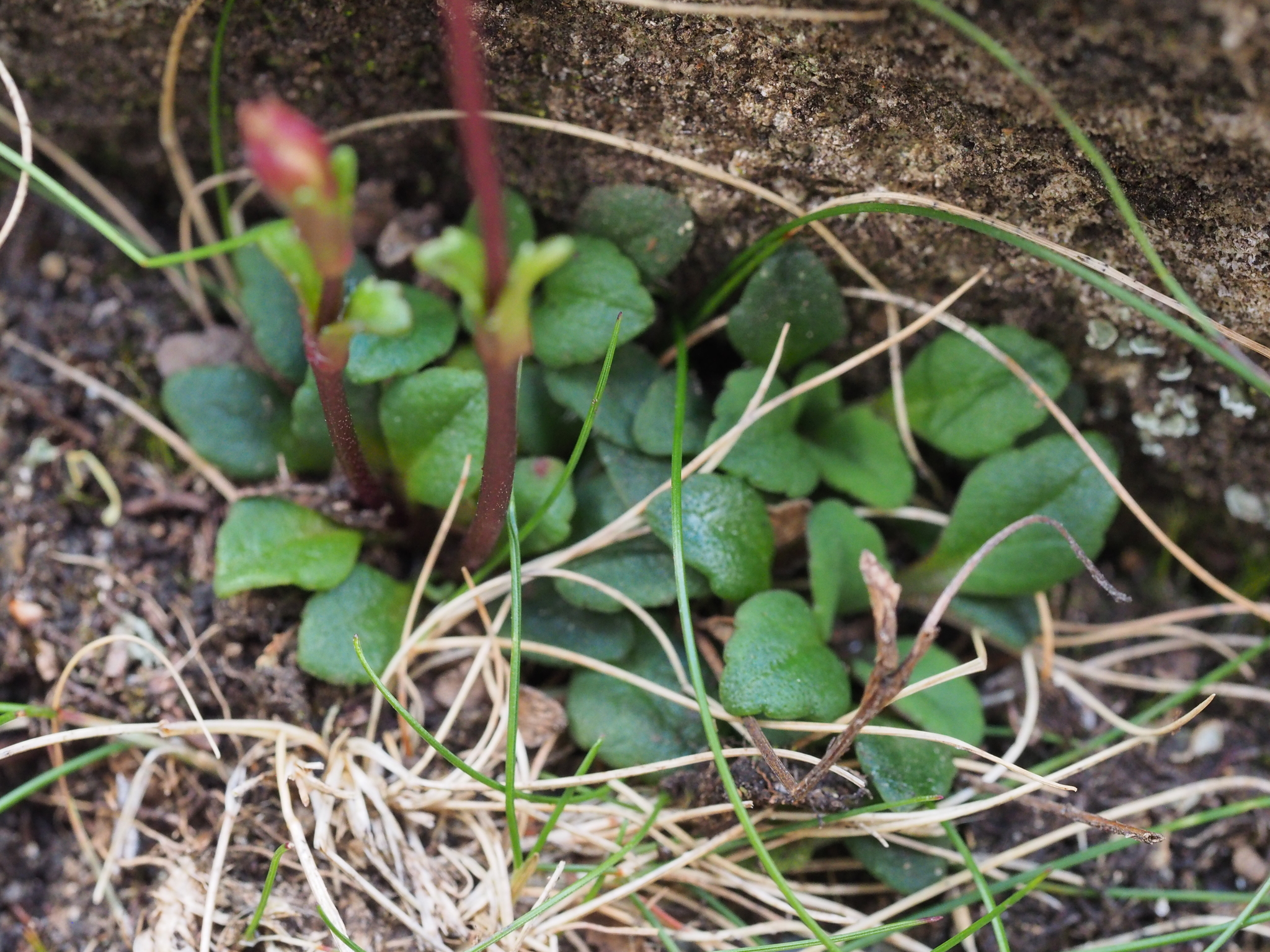
Leaves

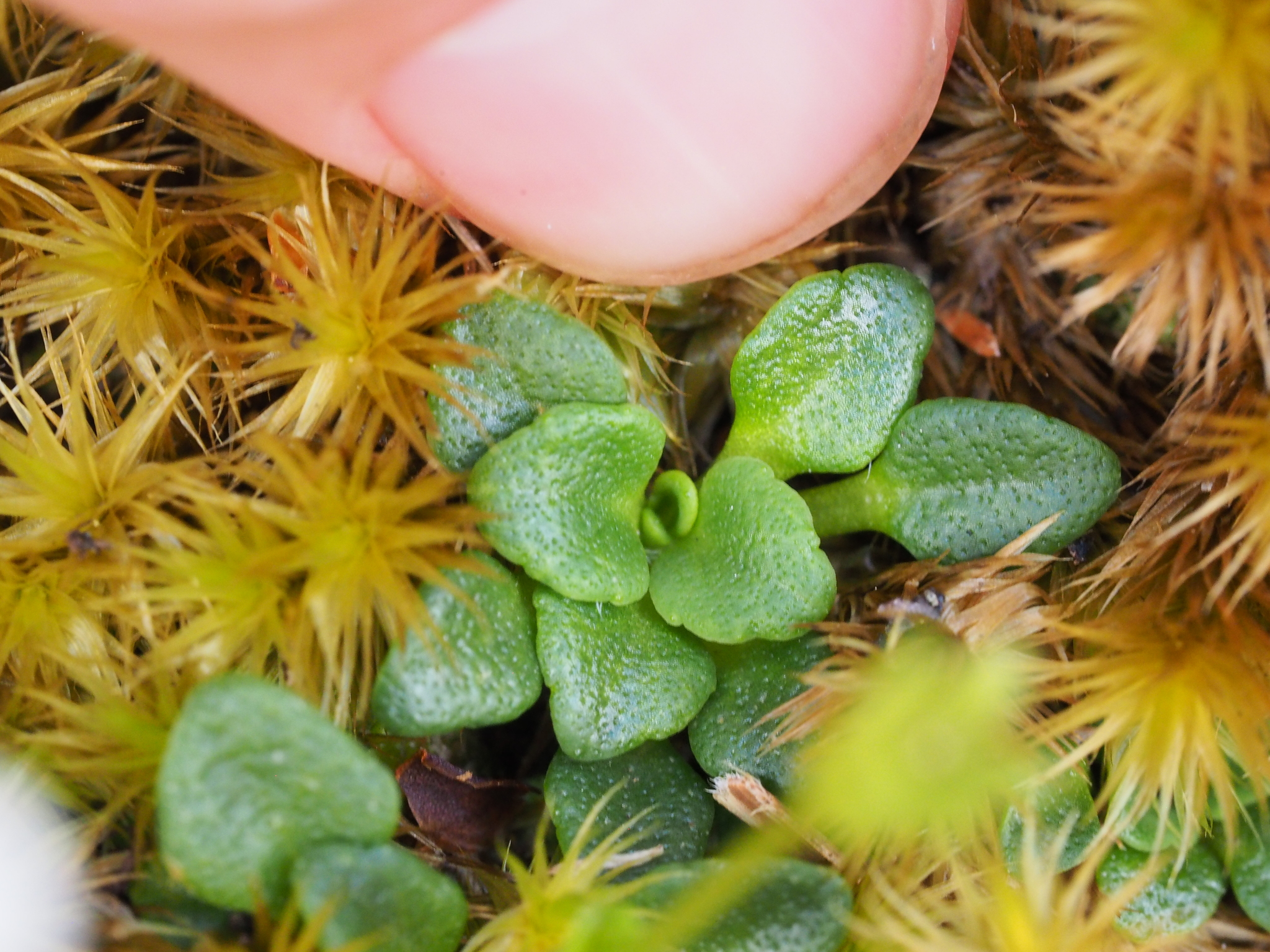
Close-up of leaves

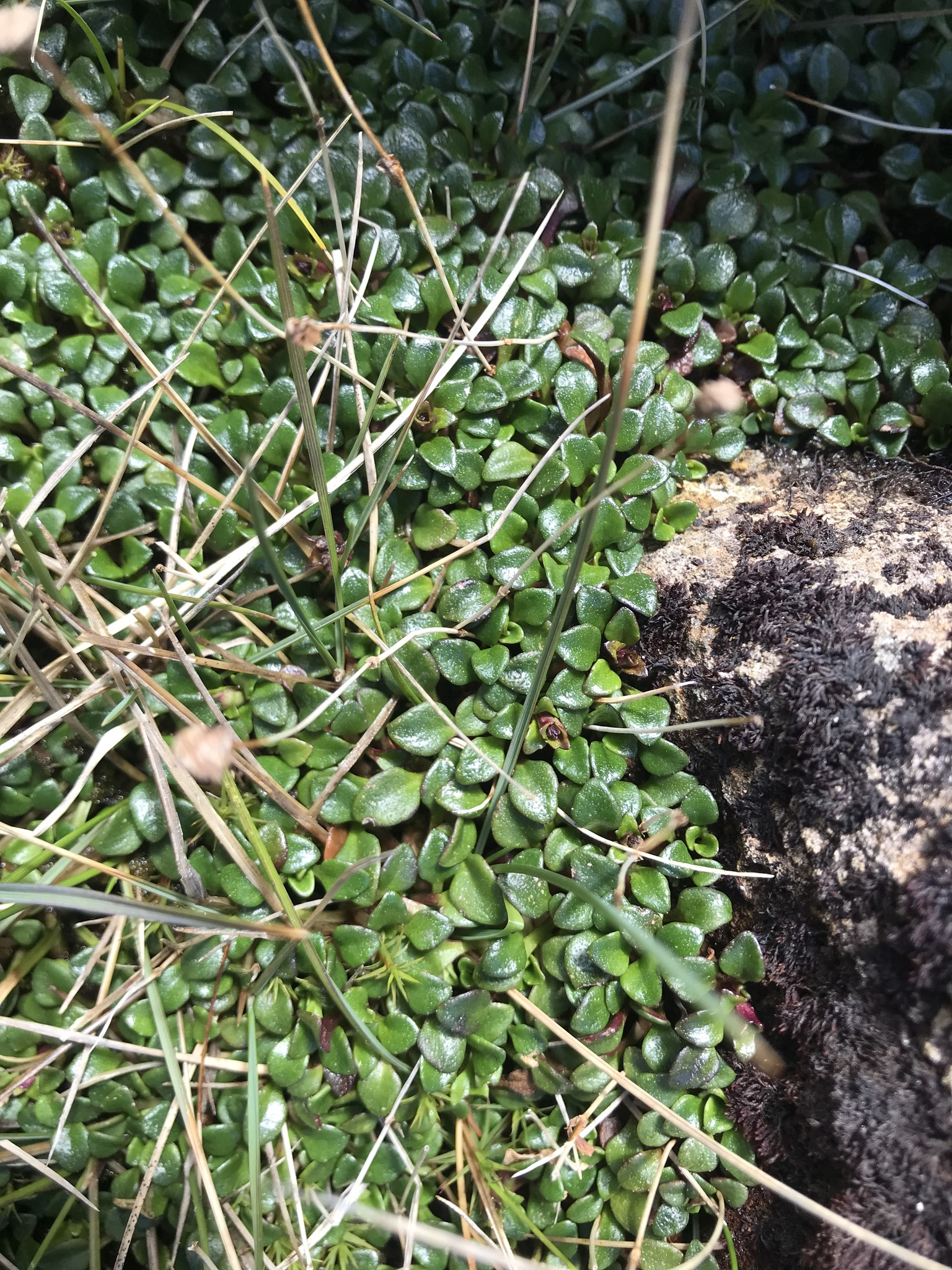
Leaves

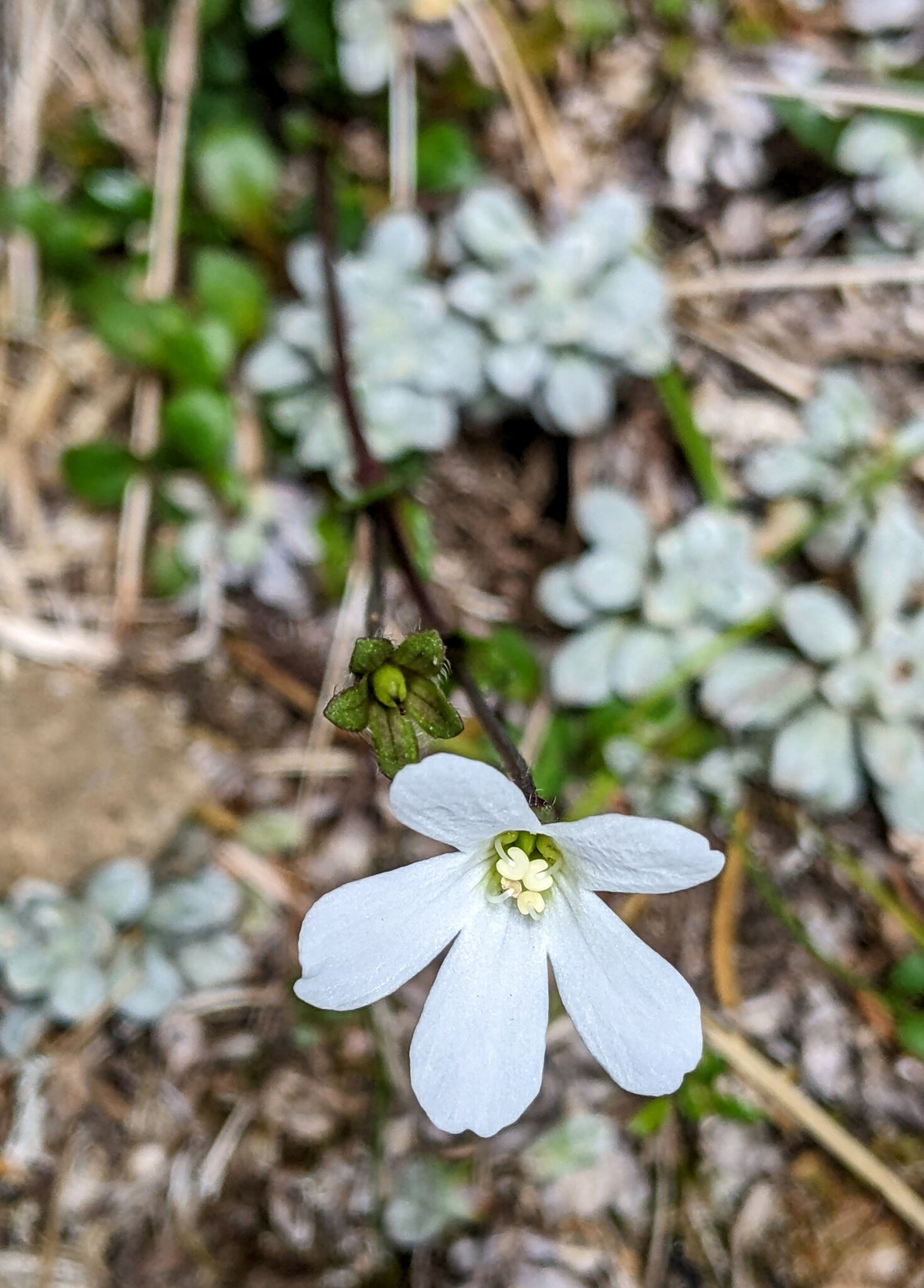
Inflorescence with two flowers, showing corolla and stamens (right) and calyx, ovary and style (left)

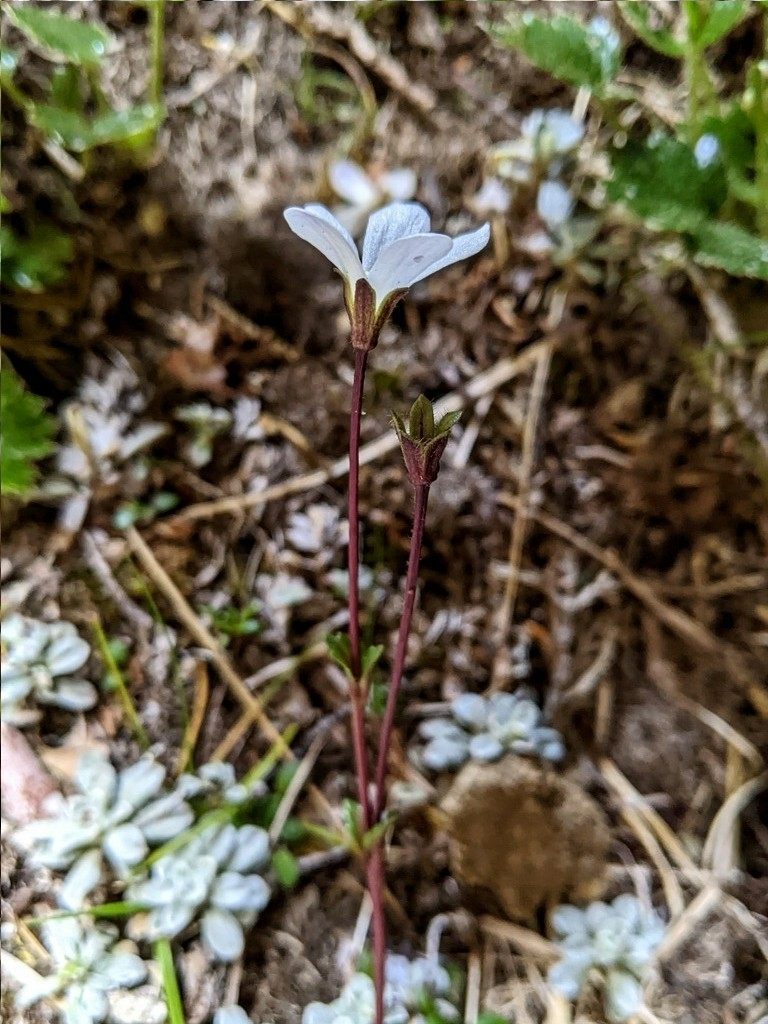
Side view of corolla and calyx

== Distribution and habitat ==
Ourisia integrifolia is endemic to Tasmania, Australia.

This species is usually found at or above the bushline, in montane to alpine, damp to wet herbfields, bogs, shrubland, and plateaus, in shady areas near streams or waterfalls, from 800 to 1,615 m (2,620 to 5,300 ft) above sea level.

== Phylogeny ==
Two individuals of O. integrifolia were included in phylogenetic analyses of all species of the genus Ourisia using standard DNA sequencing markers (two nuclear ribosomal DNA markers and two chloroplast DNA regions) and morphological data. The placement of O. integrifolia was not fully resolved by this analysis, and depending on the analysis, it was either placed sister to the New Zealand clade, or sister to a clade of New Zealand + South American herbaceous species.

In another phylogenetic study using amplified fragment length polymorphisms (AFLPs), six individuals were sampled of O. integrifolia. O. integrifolia was monophyletic with high support in the phylogenetic analyses of AFLP data, and was used as an outgroup to the New Zealand species and to root the tree. The six sampled individuals of O. integrifolia also comprised one of the significant clusters in the Bayesian clustering analysis.
