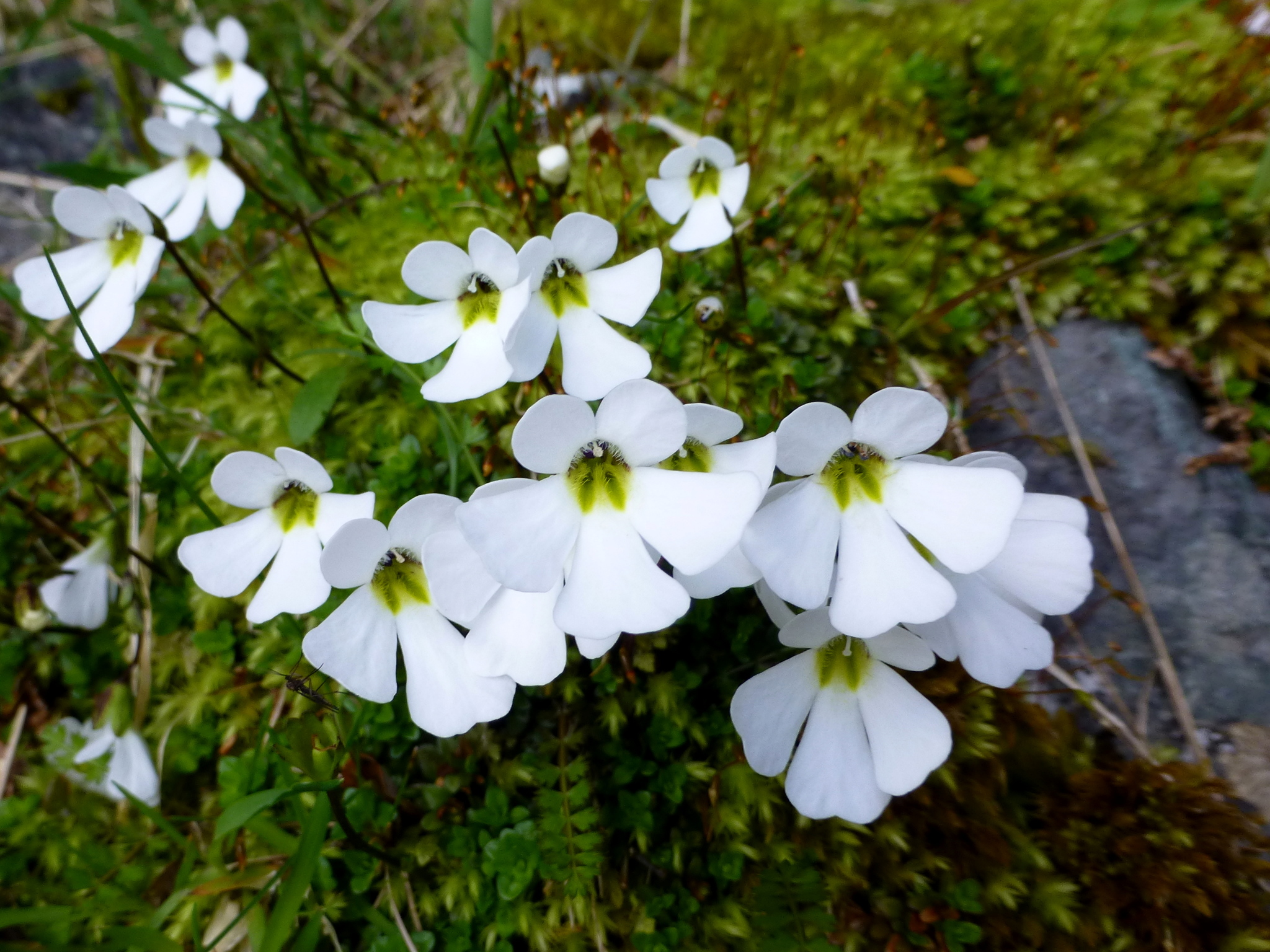
- Ourisia caespitosa flowering plants observed on the South Island, New Zealand

Conservation status
- Not Threatened (NZ TCS)

Scientific classification
- Kingdom: Plantae
- Clade: Tracheophytes
- Clade: Angiosperms
- Clade: Eudicots
- Clade: Asterids
- Order: Lamiales
- Family: Plantaginaceae
- Genus: Ourisia
- Species: O. caespitosa

Binomial name
- Ourisia caespitosa Hook.f.

Synonyms
- Ourisia caespitosa var. gracilis Hook.f.

= Ourisia caespitosa =

Species of flowering plant

Ourisia caespitosa, or creeping mountain foxglove, is a species of flowering plant in the family Plantaginaceae that is endemic to New Zealand. Joseph Dalton Hooker described O. caespitosa in 1853. Plants of this species of New Zealand foxglove are perennial herbs that are mostly glabrous (hairless), with trilobed or irregularly notched leaves that are tightly packed along a creeping stem. It is listed as Not Threatened.

== Taxonomy ==
Ourisia caespitosa Hook.f. is in the plant family Plantaginaceae. Joseph Dalton Hooker described O. caespitosa in Volume II of his Flora Antarctica series, Flora Novae-Zelandiae 1853. It is known as creeping mountain foxglove.

The type material was collected by William Colenso in the Ruahine Range of the North Island, and by David Lyall in Milford Sound, South Island, New Zealand. The lectotype was designated by Heidi Meudt and is housed at the herbarium of the Royal Botanical Gardens, Kew. Although O. caespitosa var. gracilis was described by Joseph Hooker in 1867, it was considered to be a synonym of O. caespitosa in the latest taxonomic treatment.

Ourisia caespitosa can be distinguished from all other New Zealand species of Ourisia by its mostly glabrous aspect, trilobed or irregularly notched leaves that are tightly packed along the creeping stem.

Ourisia caespitosa is morphologically most similar to another New Zealand species, O. glandulosa. It can be distinguished from that species by its hairless leaves (vs. leaves sparsely to densely hairy on the upper side) and the three lines of yellow hairs inside the corolla tube (vs. glabrous inside the tube).

== Description ==
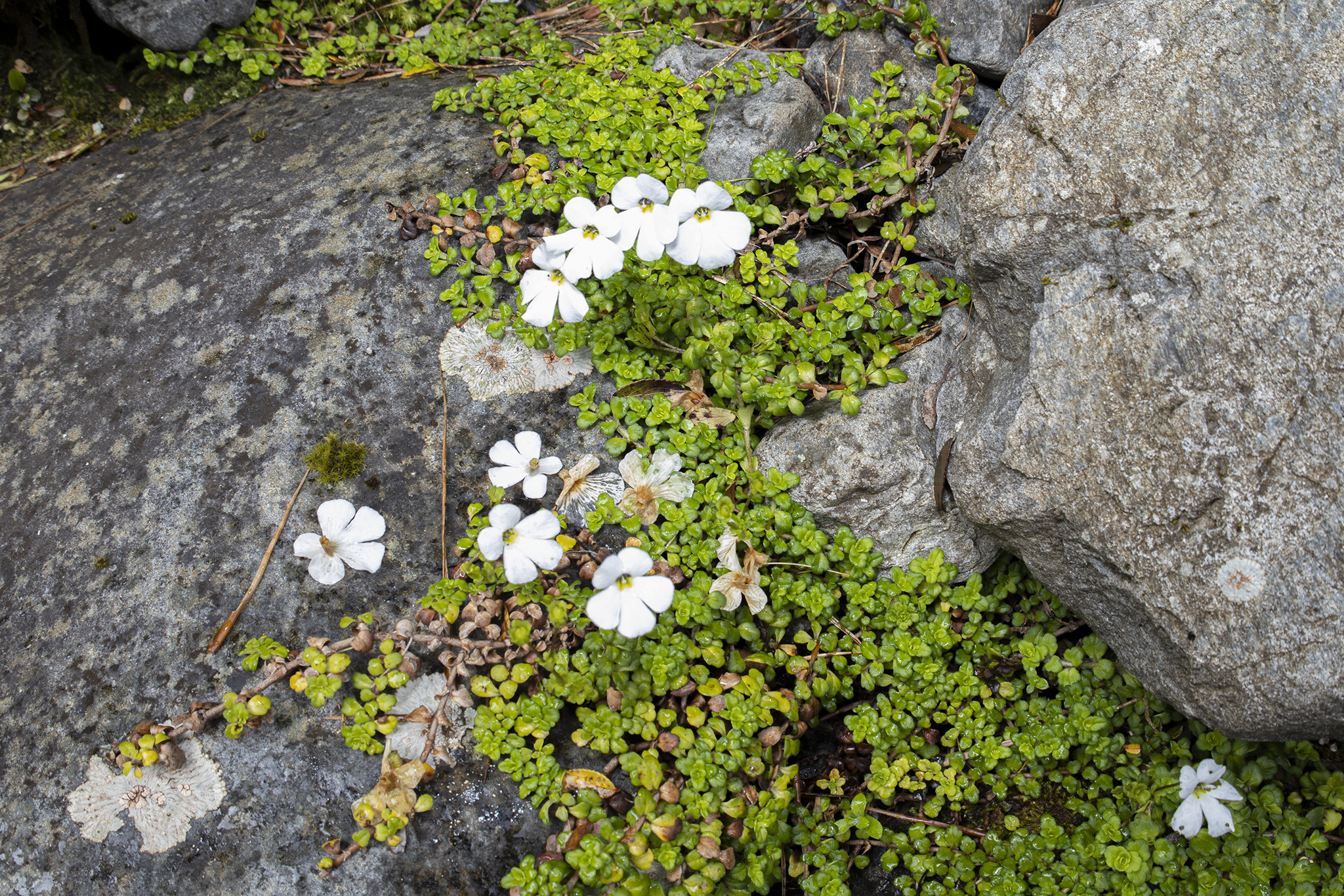
Habit of Ourisia caespitosa

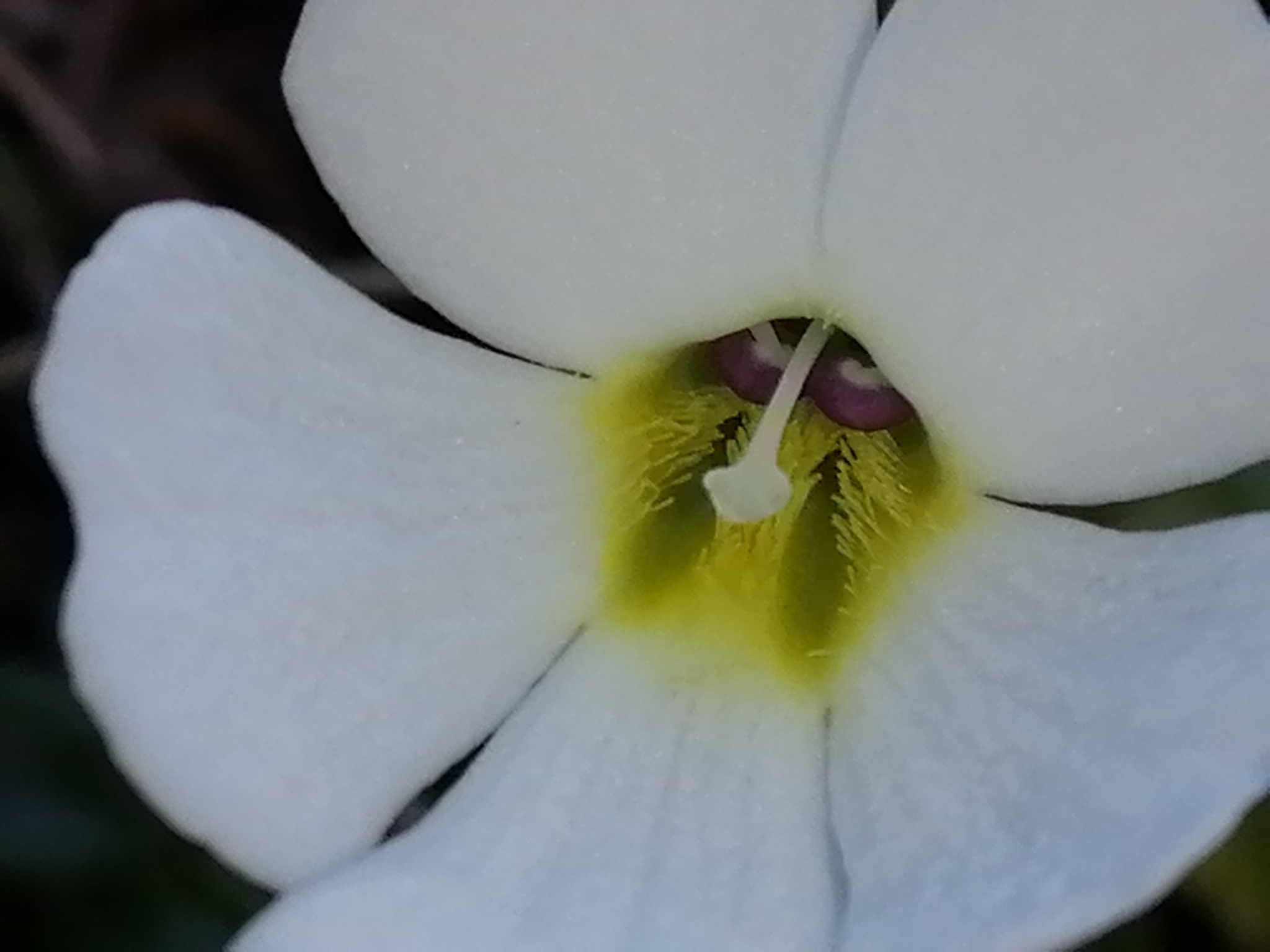
Close up of flower of Ourisia caespitosa, showing three lines of hairs inside corolla tube

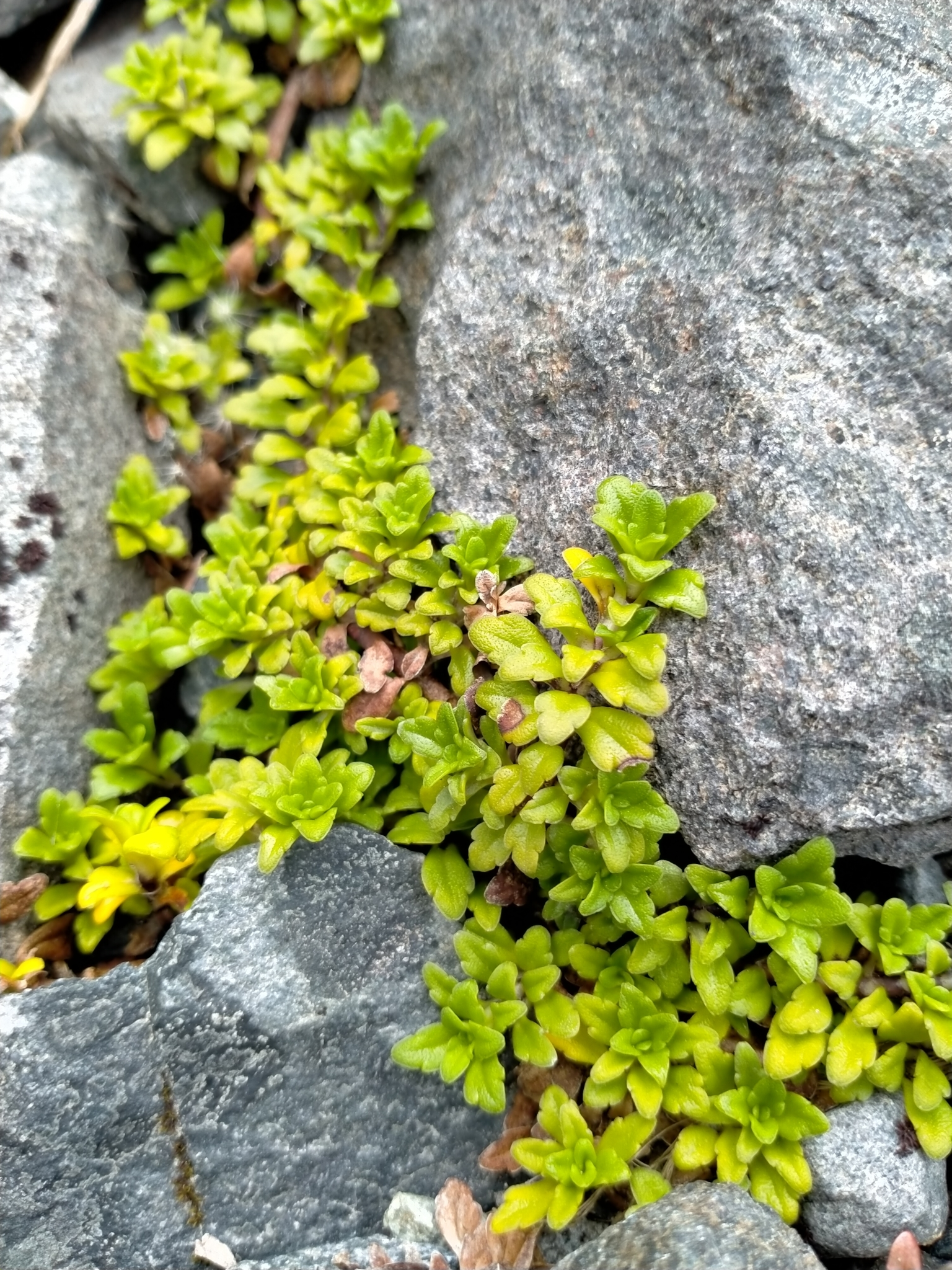
Close up of glabrous leaves of Ourisia caespitosa

Ourisia caespitosa plants are perennial herbs. The stems are creeping, many-branched, and densely packed with repent, opposite leaves. Leaf petioles are 0.8–9.4 mm long. Leaf blades are 1.9–9.4 mm long by 1.1–6.3 mm wide (length: width ratio 1.2–2.0: 1), usually narrowly to broadly ovate or obovate, widest below or above the middle, with a rounded apex, cuneate base, and trilobed or with up to 4 irregular notches or teeth. Leaves mostly glabrous, and on the lower surface densely punctate. Inflorescences are erect, glabrous racemes up to 125 mm (4.9 in) long, with 1–3 flowering nodes and up to 6 total flowers per raceme. Each flowering node 1–2 flowers and 2 sessile, clasping bracts that are usually narrowly to broadly ovate or obovate. The lowest bracts are similar to the leaves, 3.1–8.2 mm long and 1.4–6.3 mm wide, and become smaller toward the tip of the raceme. The flowers are borne on a glabrous pedicel up to 32 mm long. The calyx is 4.3–7.4 mm long, irregular, with 3 lobes divided to about one-quarter the length of the calyx and 2 divided to near the base, and usually glabrous. The corolla is 11.3–19.3 mm long (including the 3.9–9.7 mm long corolla tube), white, bilabiate, tubular-funnelform, glabrous on the outside, with 3 lines of yellow hairs on the inside. The corolla lobes are 3.5–10.9 mm long, spreading, and obovate to obcordate. There are 4 stamens up to 8.3 mm long which are didynamous, with two long exserted stamens and 2 short stamens included inside the corolla; a short staminode up to 4 mm long is also present. The style is 4.4–7.6 mm long, exserted, with a capitate stigma. The ovary is 1.8–4.0 mm long and glabrous. Fruits are capsules 4.2–6.8 mm long and 2.6–4.8 mm wide with loculicidal dehiscence and pedicels up to 21.0 mm long. There are about 160 tiny seeds in each capsule, 0.6–1.0 mm long and 0.4–0.6 mm wide, rectangular, linear oblong or narrowly oblong with a two-layered, reticulate seed coat.

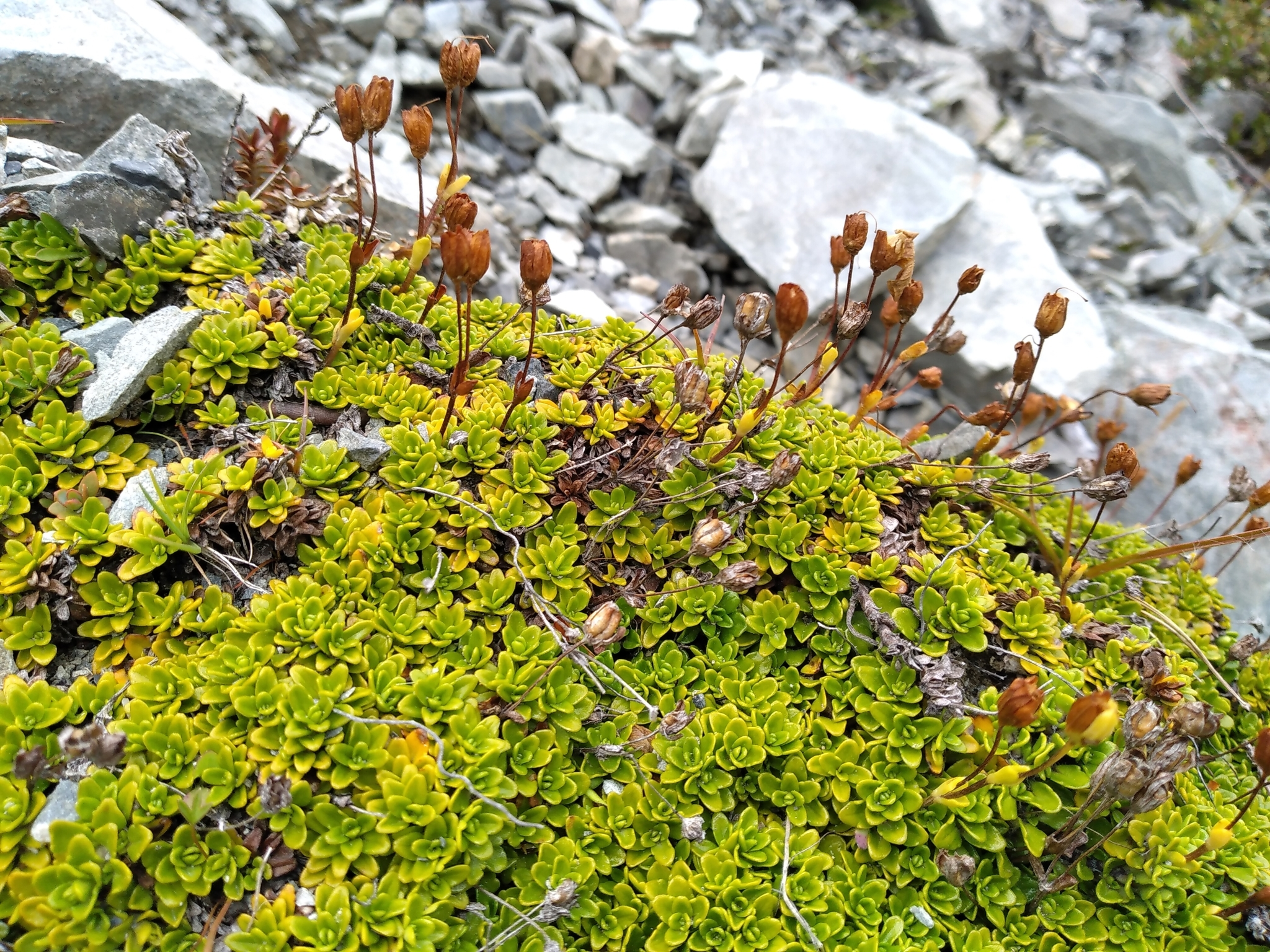
Fruiting plants of Ourisia caespitosa

Ourisia caespitosa flowers from October to March and fruits from December to April. O. caespitosa was one of eight widespread species whose populations at higher elevations flower 3–5 weeks earlier than those at lower elevations in Cupola Basin, Nelson Lakes National Park.

The chromosome number of Ourisia caespitosa is 2n=48.

== Distribution and habitat ==
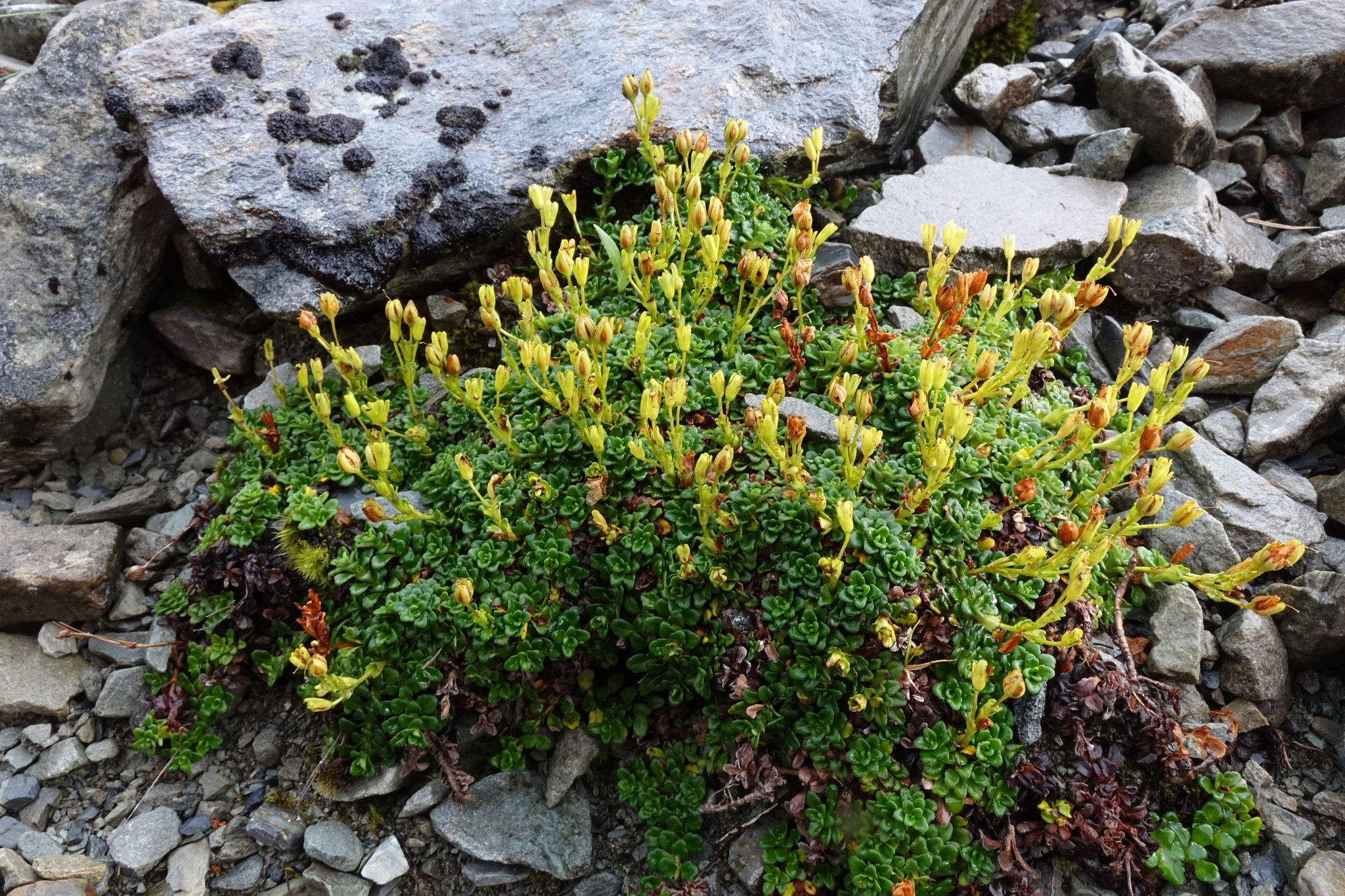
Ourisia caespitosa in alpine, rocky habitat

Ourisia caespitosa is a New Zealand foxglove that is endemic to the North, South and Stewart Islands of New Zealand. It is widespread and common in most high-elevation areas.

In the North Island, it is found in the Gisborne, Volcanic Plateau and Southern North Island regions, whereas on the South Island it widespread throughout all regions. On Stewart Island, it is known from Mount Anglem / Hananui.

It grows in herbfields, grasslands and scrub above the bush line, often in damp places, on shingle, scree, rocks, crevices, outcrops and cliffs from 540 to 2,000 metres (1,770 to 6,560 ft) above sea level.

== Phylogeny ==
Individuals of O. caespitosa were included in phylogenetic analyses of all species of the genus Ourisia using standard DNA sequencing markers (two nuclear ribosomal DNA markers and two chloroplast DNA regions) and morphological data. In all analyses, the sampled individuals belonged to the highly supported New Zealand lineage, but in the nuclear ribosomal DNA dataset and combined analyses, only three of the four sampled individuals of O. caespitosa were monophyletic. Relationships between New Zealand species were nevertheless not well resolved.

In another phylogenetic study using amplified fragment length polymorphisms (AFLPs), all 49 sampled individuals formed a clade or a significant cluster the analyses, and there were three distinct geographical lineages within this cluster comprising individuals from 1) central North Island, 2) southern South Island and remaining North Island individuals, and 3) Otago, South Island.

== Biology ==
Ourisia caespitosa was one of several New Zealand alpine flowering plants used in field experiments to show that flower color influences insect visitation in alpine New Zealand.

O. caespitosa is one of many alpine species from New Zealand with axillary buds (flower primordia) that form in autumn, but it is also one of a handful of species whose axillary buds are obviously enlarged.

Seeds of O. caespitosa contain ecdysteroids at 4.5 mg per gram.

== Hybridisation ==
Ourisia caespitosa forms natural hybrids with several other species of Ourisia in New Zealand. Ourisia × prorepens Petrie is an interspecific hybrid between O. caespitosa and O. sessilifolia. O. × cockayneana Petrie is another named interspecific hybrid between O. caespitosa and O. calycina. Other hybrids that have been collected at least once include O. caespitosa × macrocarpa, O. caespitosa × macrophylla, O. caespitosa × glandulosa, and O. caespitosa × simpsonii.

== Conservation status ==
Ourisia caespitosa is listed as Not Threatened in the most recent assessment (2017–2018) of the New Zealand Threatened Classification for plants.
