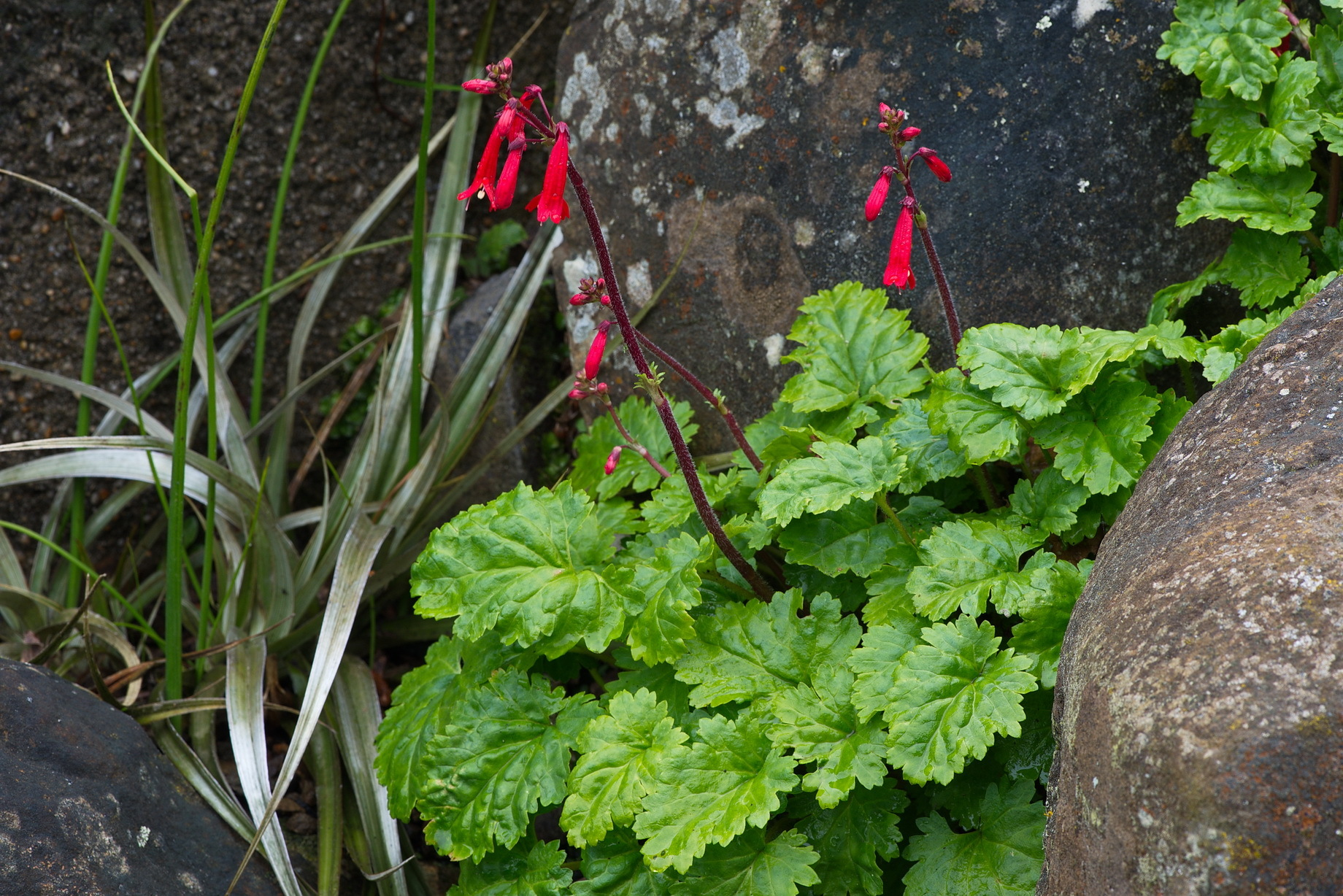
- Flowering plant of Ourisia coccinea subsp. elegnas, cultivated in New Zealand

Scientific classification
- Kingdom: Plantae
- Clade: Tracheophytes
- Clade: Angiosperms
- Clade: Eudicots
- Clade: Asterids
- Order: Lamiales
- Family: Plantaginaceae
- Genus: Ourisia
- Species: O. coccinea
- Subspecies: O. c. subsp. elegans

Trinomial name
- Ourisia coccinea subsp. elegans (Phil.) Meudt

Synonyms
- Ourisia coccinea var. minor Benth. in D.C.; Ourisia coccinea var. elegans (Phil.) Reiche

= Ourisia coccinea subsp. elegans =

Subspecies of flowering plant

Ourisia coccinea subsp. elegans is a subspecies of flowering plant in the family Plantaginaceae that is endemic to mountainous habitats of the Andes of southern Chile. Rodolfo Amando Philippi described O. elegans in 1859, which is now recognised as a subspecies of O. coccinea. This subspecies is found in the northern and western parts of the species' range, and has crenate, lobed leaves that are glabrous (hairless) on the upper surface and pedicels with glandular hairs that are less than 0.1 mm long.

== Taxonomy ==
Ourisia coccinea subsp. elegans is in the plant family Plantaginaceae. It was first described by Rodolfo Amando Philippi as O. elegans in 1859, and is now recognised as a subspecies of O. coccinea. The type material was collected in the Chilean Los Ríos Region at Futa, Valdivia Province, by Philippi in 1854. The lectotype was designated by Argentinian botanist Ricardo Rossow and is housed at the Chilean National Museum of Natural History in Santiago (herbarium SGO) (SGO 056367). O. coccinea var. minor, described by George Bentham in 1846, is a synonym, as is O. coccinea var. elegans.

Two allopatric subspecies of O. coccinea are recognised, with O. coccinea subsp. elegans from the northern and western areas, whereas O. coccinea subsp. coccinea is distributed in the eastern and southern parts of the species' range.

The two subspecies can be distinguished by their leaf edges, leaf hairs, and pedicel hairs. Ourisia coccinea subsp. elegans has crenate, lobed leaves that are hairless on the upper surface, and pedicels that are sparsely hairy with tiny, subsessile glandular hairs (<0.1 mm). By contrast, O. coccinea subsp. coccinea has crenate but unlobed leaves that are hairy on the upper surface, and pedicels that are densely hairy with short to long glandular hairs (0.1-0.7 mm long).

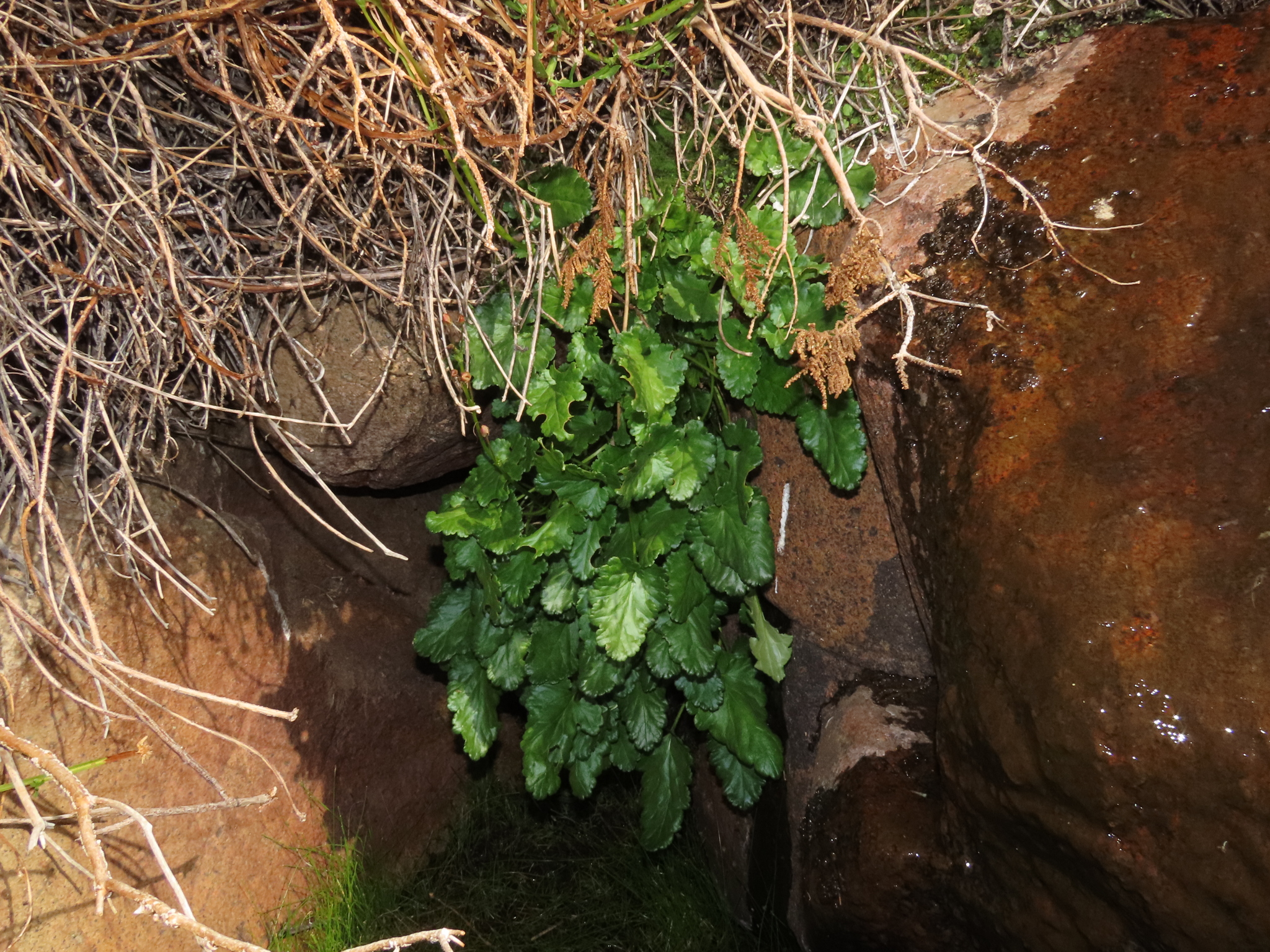
Lobed, crenate leaves

== Description ==
Ourisia coccinea subsp. elegans plants are perennial, erect, rosette herbs. The short stems are 2.8–8.9 mm wide, and glabrous (hairless) or rarely hairy with long, non-glandular hairs. Leaves are tightly clustered in a subrosette or rosette, petiolate, 16.6–52.2 mm long by 17.8–55.9 mm wide (length: width ratio 0.8–1.0:1). Leaf petioles are 2–14 cm long and densely hairy with long non-glandular hairs. Leaf blades are narrowly ovate, ovate, broadly ovate, or very broadly ovate, widest below the middle, usually with a rounded apex, cordate base, and crenate edges that are also lobed. Both surfaces of the leaves are usually glabrous and the lower surface is also punctate. Inflorescences are erect, with hairy racemes up to 53 cm long, and with 3–8 flowering nodes and up to 29 total flowers per raceme. Each flowering node has 1–2 flowers and 2 petiolate to sessile bracts that are oblanceolate to obovate or lanceolate to very broadly ovate. The bracts are similar to the leaves but smaller, 3.6–24.1 mm long and 1.1–13.3 mm wide and petiolate (lower bracts only) or sessile. The flowers are borne on a pedicel that is up to 47.5 mm long and hairy mostly near the calyx with tiny (<0.1 mm) glandular hairs. The calyx is 2.6–5.3 mm long, regular, with all 5 lobes equally divided to the base of the calyx, glabrous or sometimes hairy with tiny to short, sessile or stalked (to 0.1 mm) glandular hairs on the outside of the calyx. The corolla is 30.9–33.3 mm long (including a 19.7–29.9 mm long corolla tube), straight or slightly curved, bilabiate, tubular-funnelform, red, with dark parallel striations, glabrous or hairy with tiny, sessile glandular hairs on the outside, and glabrous inside. The corolla lobes are 3.0–10.5 mm long, not spreading or only slightly spreading, sub-rectangular or rounded and deeply emarginate. There are 4 stamens which are didynamous, with two long stamens that are exserted, and two short stamens that reach the corolla tube opening or are included. The style is 20.1–30.6 mm long, exserted, with an emarginate or capitate stigma. The ovary is 3.5–4.3 mm long. Fruits are capsules with loculicidal dehiscence, and fruiting pedicels are 20.2–29.2 mm long. The number of seeds in each capsule is unknown, and seeds are 0.6–1.2 mm long and 0.2–0.8 mm wide, elliptic, with a weakly two-layered (or sometimes one-layered) reticulate (having a net-like pattern) seed coat with thick, smooth, shallow, primary reticula.

Ourisia coccinea subsp. elegans flowers and fruits from October to February.

The chromosome number of Ourisia coccinea subsp. elegans is unknown.

== Distribution and habitat ==
Ourisia coccinea subsp. elegans is endemic to the Andes mountains of Chile from approximately 31°S to 40°S latitude, in the northern and western parts of the range of O. coccinea. It is found in the Chilean regions of Coquimbo, Santiago Metropolitan, O'Higgins, Maule, Ñuble, Biobío, Araucanía, Los Ríos, and Los Lagos. It usually grows at 90 to 1250 m above sea level, but in the northern part of its range, it can attain elevations of 1800 to 2600 m. It is found in shady forests on stream or river banks near running water.

== Phylogeny ==
One individual of O. coccinea subsp. elegans was included in a phylogenetic analysis of all species of the genus Ourisia, using standard DNA sequencing markers (two nuclear ribosomal DNA markers and two chloroplast DNA regions) and morphological data. O. coccinea subsp. elegans was always placed with high support in the clade of Andean herbaceous species, and was always highly supported as the sister species to O. alpina (O. coccinea subsp. coccinea was not sampled).
