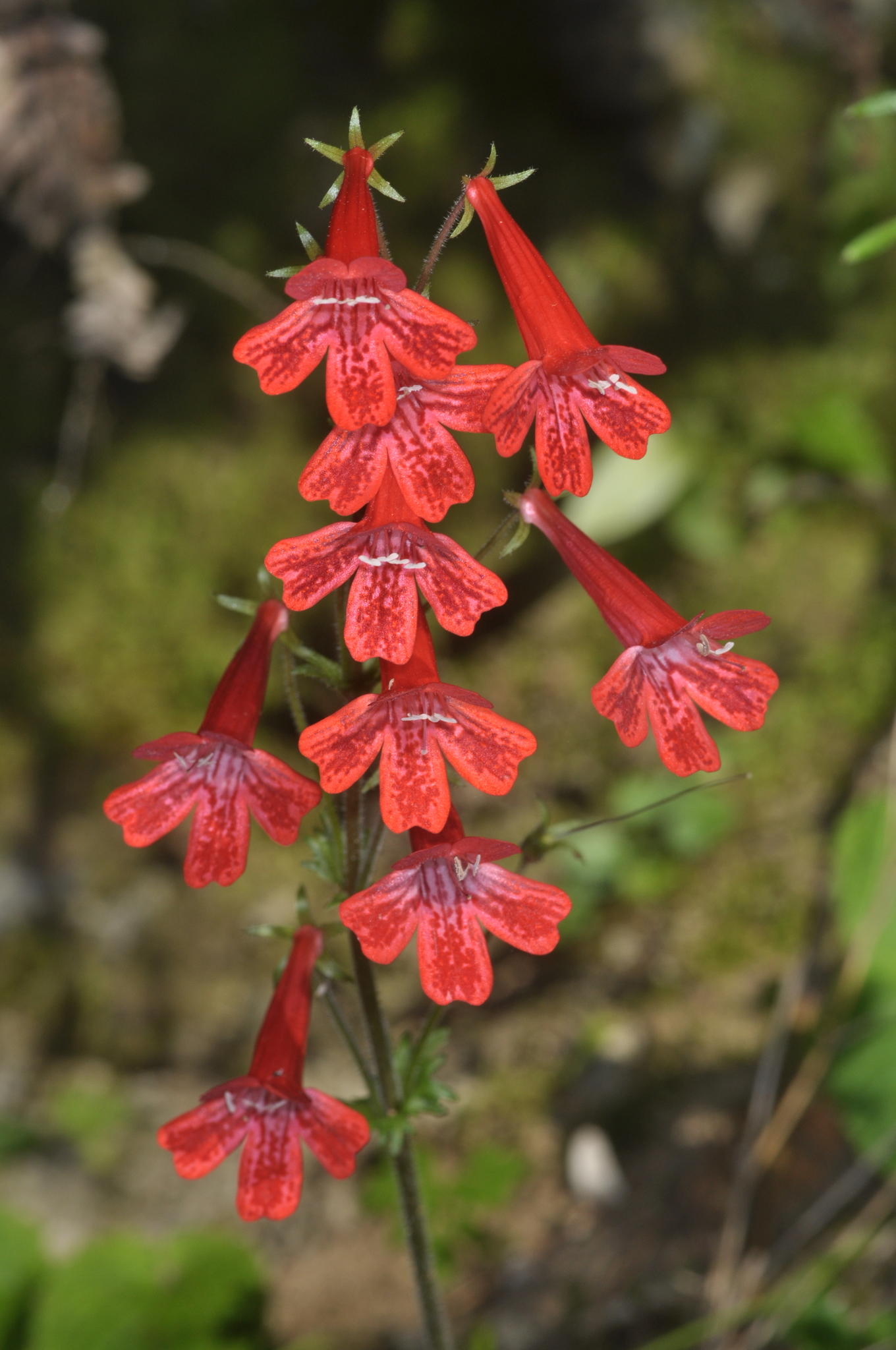
- Flowering plant of Ourisia coccinea subsp. coccinea, Lácar Department, Neuquen, Argentina

Scientific classification
- Kingdom: Plantae
- Clade: Tracheophytes
- Clade: Angiosperms
- Clade: Eudicots
- Clade: Asterids
- Order: Lamiales
- Family: Plantaginaceae
- Genus: Ourisia
- Species: O. coccinea
- Subspecies: O. c. subsp. coccinea

Trinomial name
- Ourisia coccinea subsp. coccinea (Cav.) Pers.

Synonyms
- Dichroma coccinea Pers.; Ourisia villosa Molina; Ourisia pearcei Phil.

= Ourisia coccinea subsp. coccinea =

Subspecies of flowering plant

Ourisia coccinea subsp. coccinea is a subspecies of flowering plant in the family Plantaginaceae that is endemic to mountainous habitats of the Andes of southern Chile and Argentina. Christiaan Hendrik Persoon described O. coccinea in 1806. This subspecies is found in the eastern and southern parts of the species' range, and has crenate, unlobed leaves that are hairy on the upper surface and pedicels with glandular hairs that are 0.1—0.7 mm long.

== Taxonomy ==
Ourisia coccinea subsp. coccinea is in the plant family Plantaginaceae. The type material was collected in the Chilean Los Lagos Region at San Carlos de Chiloé (now Ancud) by Luis Neé during the Malaspina Expedition. The holotype is housed at the Real Jardín Botánico de Madrid (herbarium MA) (MA-475622!).

Two allopatric subspecies of O. coccinea are recognised, with O. coccinea subsp. coccinea is distributed in the eastern and southern parts of the species' range, and O. coccinea subsp. elegans from the northern and western areas.

The two subspecies can be distinguished by their leaf edges, leaf hairs, and pedicel hairs. O. coccinea subsp. coccinea has crenate but unlobed leaves that are hairy on the upper surface, and pedicels that are densely hairy with short to long glandular hairs (0.1–0.7 mm long). By contrast, O. coccinea subsp. elegans has crenate, lobed leaves hairs that are hairless on the upper surface, and pedicels that are sparsely hairy with tiny, subsessile glandular hairs (<0.1 mm).

== Description ==
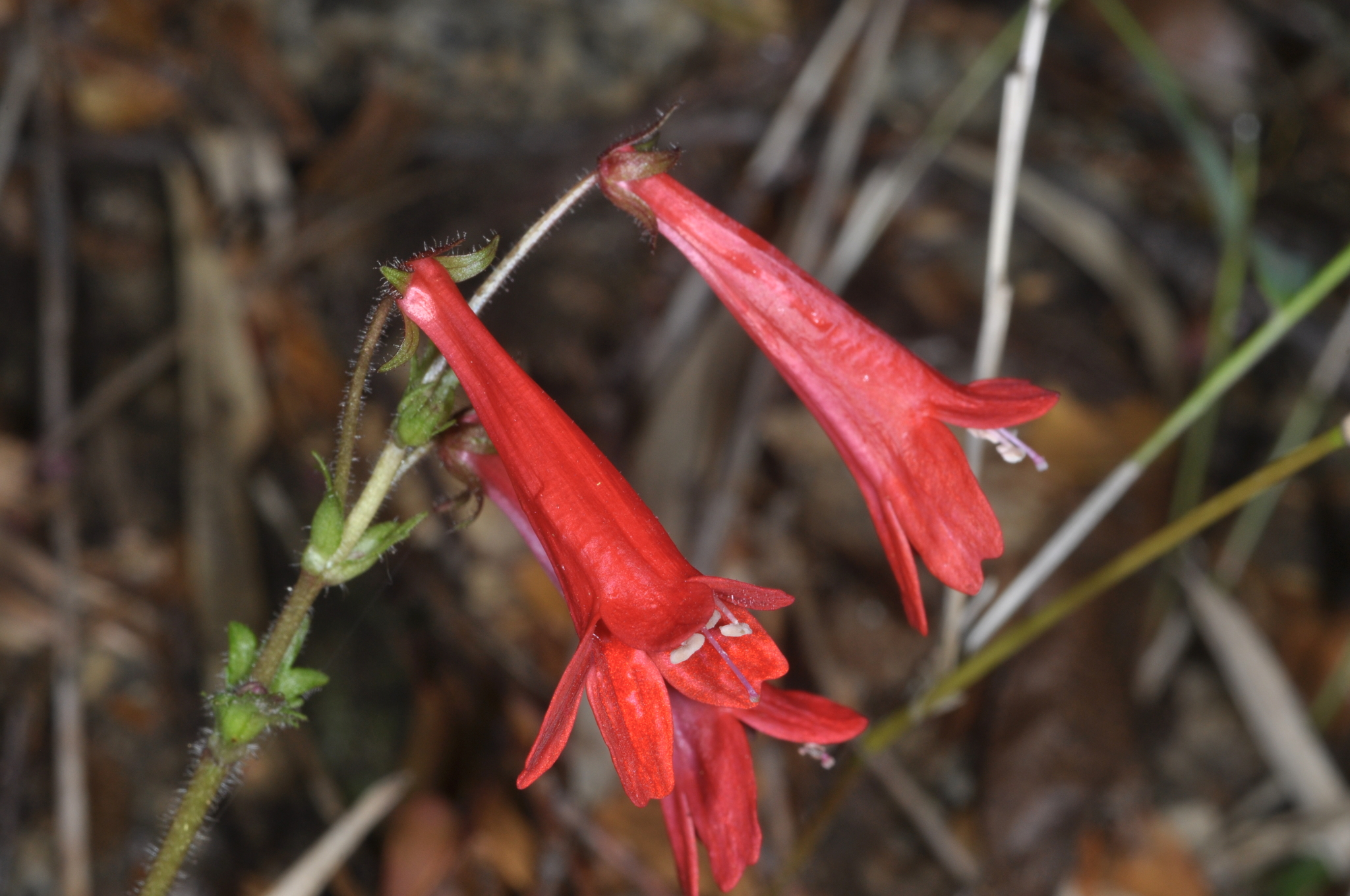
O. coccinea subsp. coccinea has short to long (0.1-0.7 mm) glandular hairs on the pedicel as shown here, compared to tiny (<0.1 mm) glandular hairs of subsp. elegans

Ourisia coccinea subsp. coccinea plants are perennial, erect, rosette herbs. The short stems are 2.8–8.9 mm wide, and glabrous (hairless) or rarely hairy with long, non-glandular hairs. Leaves are tightly clustered in a subrosette or rosette, petiolate, 22.0–92.1 mm long by 14.2–74.3 mm wide (length: width ratio 1.2–1.7:1). Leaf petioles are 2–14 cm long and densely hairy with long non-glandular hairs. Leaf blades are narrowly ovate, ovate, broadly ovate, or very broadly ovate, widest below the middle, usually with a rounded apex, cordate or truncate base, and crenate edges that are not lobed. The upper surface of the leaves is sparsely hairy with non-glandular hairs, and the lower surface of the leaves is glabrous or sparsely hairy with non-glandular hairs and also punctate. Inflorescences are erect, with hairy racemes up to 53 cm long, and with 3–8 flowering nodes and up to 29 total flowers per raceme. Each flowering node has 1–2 flowers and 2 petiolate to sessile bracts that are oblanceolate to obovate or lanceolate to very broadly ovate. The bracts are similar to the leaves but smaller, 3.6–24.1 mm long and 1.1–13.3 mm wide and petiolate (lower bracts only) or sessile. The flowers are borne on a pedicel that is up to 85.2 mm long and is sparsely to densely hairy with tiny to long (<0.1 mm to 0.7 mm) glandular hairs. The calyx is 5.06–9.4 mm long, regular, with all 5 lobes equally divided to the base of the calyx, glabrous or sometimes hairy with a mix of non-glandular and glandular hairs on the outside of the calyx. The corolla is 34.2–35.0 mm long (including a 19.7–29.9 mm long corolla tube), straight or slightly curved, bilabiate, tubular-funnelform, red, with dark parallel striations, glabrous or hairy with tiny, sessile glandular hairs on the outside, and glabrous inside. The corolla lobes are 3.0–10.5 mm long, not spreading or only slightly spreading, sub-rectangular or rounded and deeply emarginate. There are 4 stamens which are didynamous, with two long stamens that are exserted, and two short stamens that reach the corolla tube opening or are included. The style is 20.1–30.6 mm long, exserted, with an emarginate or capitate stigma. The ovary is 3.5–4.3 mm long. Fruits are capsules with loculicidal dehiscence, and fruiting pedicels are 20.2–29.2 mm long. The number of seeds in each capsule is unknown, and seeds are 0.7–1.0 mm long and 0.5–0.6 mm wide, elliptic, with a weakly two-layered (or sometimes one-layered) reticulate (having a net-like pattern) seed coat with thick, smooth, shallow, primary reticula.

Ourisia coccinea subsp. coccinea flowers and fruits from October to March.

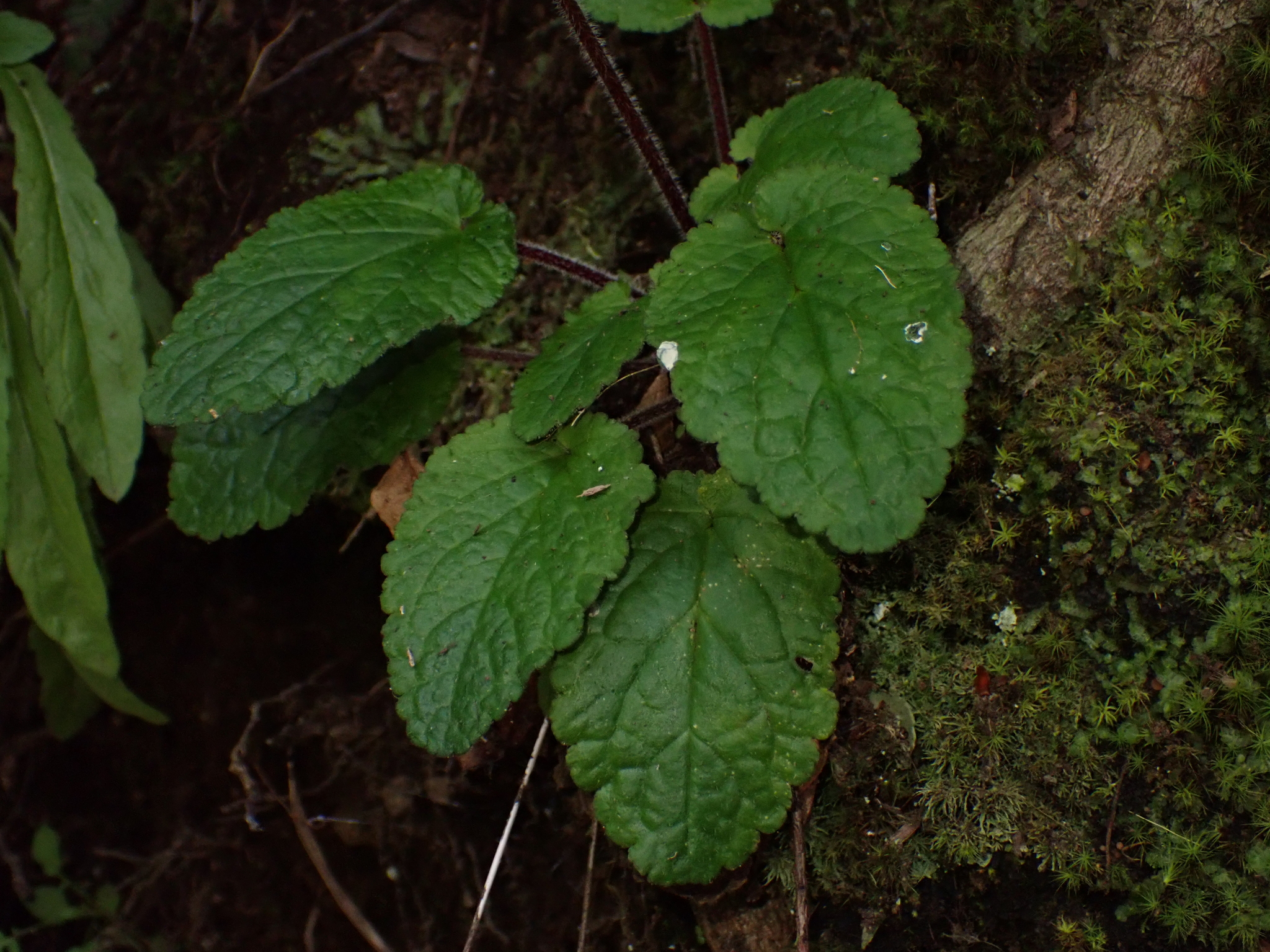
Sparsely hairy, crenate, unlobed rosette leaves of O. coccinea subsp. coccinea

The chromosome number of Ourisia coccinea subsp. coccinea is 2n = 16.

== Distribution and habitat ==
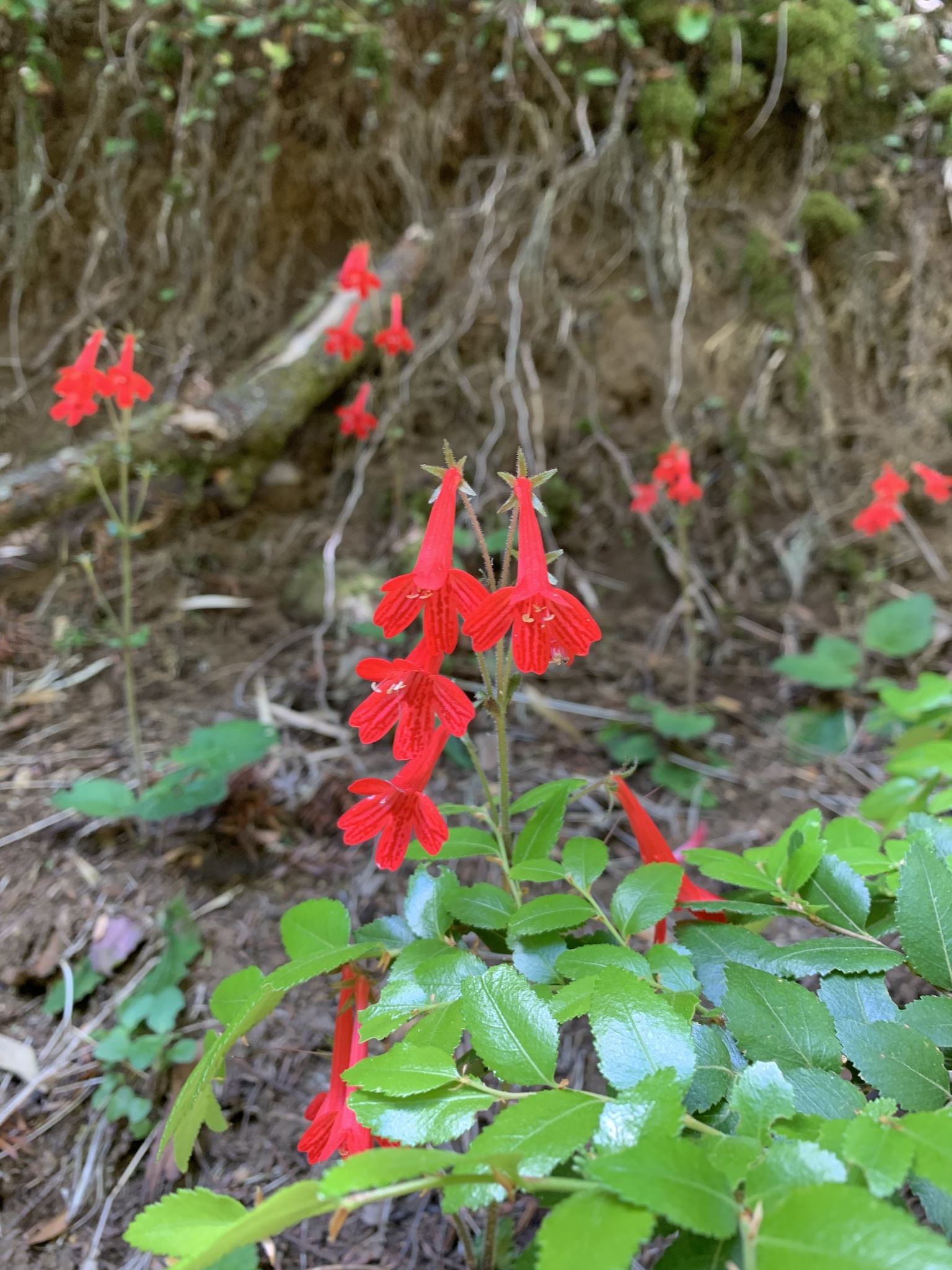
Shady, forest habitat of O. coccinea subsp. coccinea in Araucanía Region, Chile

Ourisia coccinea subsp. coccinea is native to the Andes mountains of Chile and Argentina from approximately 36°S to 46°S latitude, in the eastern and southern parts of the range of O. coccinea. In Chile it is found in the regions of Ñuble, Biobío, Araucanía, Los Ríos, Los Lagos, and Aysén, and in Argentina it is found in the province of Neuquén. It grows in habitats ranging from sea level to 1600 m elevation in rocky, wet habitats, including near running water, often in shady forests.

== Phylogeny ==
No individuals of O. coccinea subsp. coccinea were included in a phylogenetic analysis of all species of the genus Ourisia, using standard DNA sequencing markers (two nuclear ribosomal DNA markers and two chloroplast DNA regions) and morphological data.
