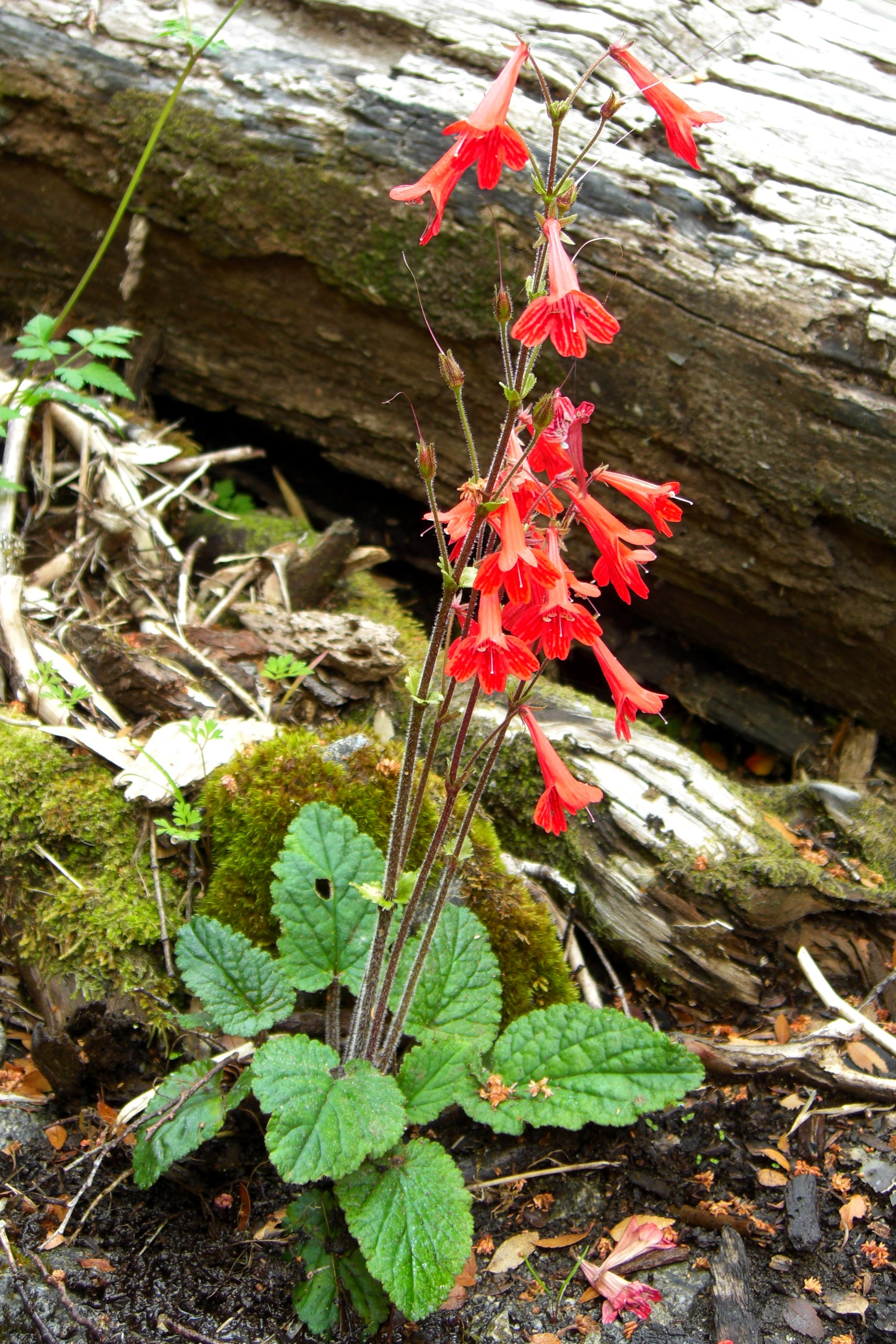
- Flowering plant of Ourisia coccinea, Huerquehue National Park, Chile

Scientific classification
- Kingdom: Plantae
- Clade: Tracheophytes
- Clade: Angiosperms
- Clade: Eudicots
- Clade: Asterids
- Order: Lamiales
- Family: Plantaginaceae
- Genus: Ourisia
- Species: O. coccinea

Binomial name
- Ourisia coccinea (Cav.) Pers.

Synonyms
- Dichroma coccinea Pers.; Ourisia villosa Molina

= Ourisia coccinea =

Species of flowering plant

Ourisia coccinea is a species of flowering plant in the family Plantaginaceae that is endemic to mountainous habitats of the Andes of southern Chile and Argentina. Christiaan Hendrik Persoon described O. coccinea in 1806. Plants of this species of South American foxglove are perennial, hairy, rosette herbs with crenate leaves. There can be up to 30 flowers on a long, erect raceme, and each flower has a regular calyx, and a long, bilabiate, tubular-funnelform, red corolla with two exserted and two included stamens. The calyx is hairy with a mix of glandular and non-glandular hairs, and the corolla is usually hairless or with some glandular hairs on the outside. There are two allopatric subspecies that can be distinguished by the edges and hairs of the leaves, and by the hairs on the pedicel. It is often used as an ornamental plant.

== Taxonomy ==
Ourisia coccinea is in the plant family Plantaginaceae. Dichroma coccinea was first described by Spanish botanist Antonio José Cavanilles in 1801, and Christiaan Hendrik Persoon transferred it to the genus Ourisia as O. coccinea in 1806.

The type material was collected in the Chilean Los Lagos Region at San Carlos de Chiloé (now Ancud) by Luis Neé during the Malaspina Expedition. The holotype is housed at the Real Jardín Botánico de Madrid (herbarium MA) (MA-475622!).

Ourisia vellosa, which was described by Chilean botanist and Jesuit priest Juan Ignacio Molina in 1810, is a synonym of O. coccinea.

Ourisia coccinea is one of ten species of Ourisia in the southern Andes of Chile and Argentina, together with Ourisia breviflora, O. alpina, O. fragrans, O. fuegiana, O. pygmaea, O. ruellioides, O. microphylla, O. polyantha and O. serpyllifolia. O. coccinea and the first six species listed above are in the herbaceous subgenus Ourisia, whereas O. microphylla, O. polyantha and O. serpyllifolia are the only three species in the suffruticose subgenus Suffruticosa.

Ourisia coccinea is most similar to O. alpina in its strongly bilabiate corollas with dark lines, rosette habit, and regularly crenate leaves. O. coccinea can be distinguished from O. alpina by its longer, red corollas that are >2.7 cm long (vs. smaller, pink corollas that are 1.1–2.2 cm long in O. alpina) and corolla lobes that are not spreading (vs. spreading in O. alpina).

In the most recent taxonomic treatment, two allopatric subspecies of O. coccinea are recognised: O. coccinea subsp. coccinea from the more eastern and southern parts of its range, and O. coccinea subsp. elegans from the northern and western areas. The subspecies can be distinguished from one another by the leaf edges and hairs, and by the pedicel hairs.

Specifically, O. coccinea subsp. coccinea has crenate but unlobed leaves that are hairy on the upper surface, and pedicels that are densely hairy with short to long glandular hairs (0.1-0.7 mm long), whereas O. coccinea subsp. elegans has crenate, lobed leaves that are hairless on the upper surface, and pedicels that are sparsely hairy with tiny, subsessile glandular hairs (<0.1 mm).

== Description ==
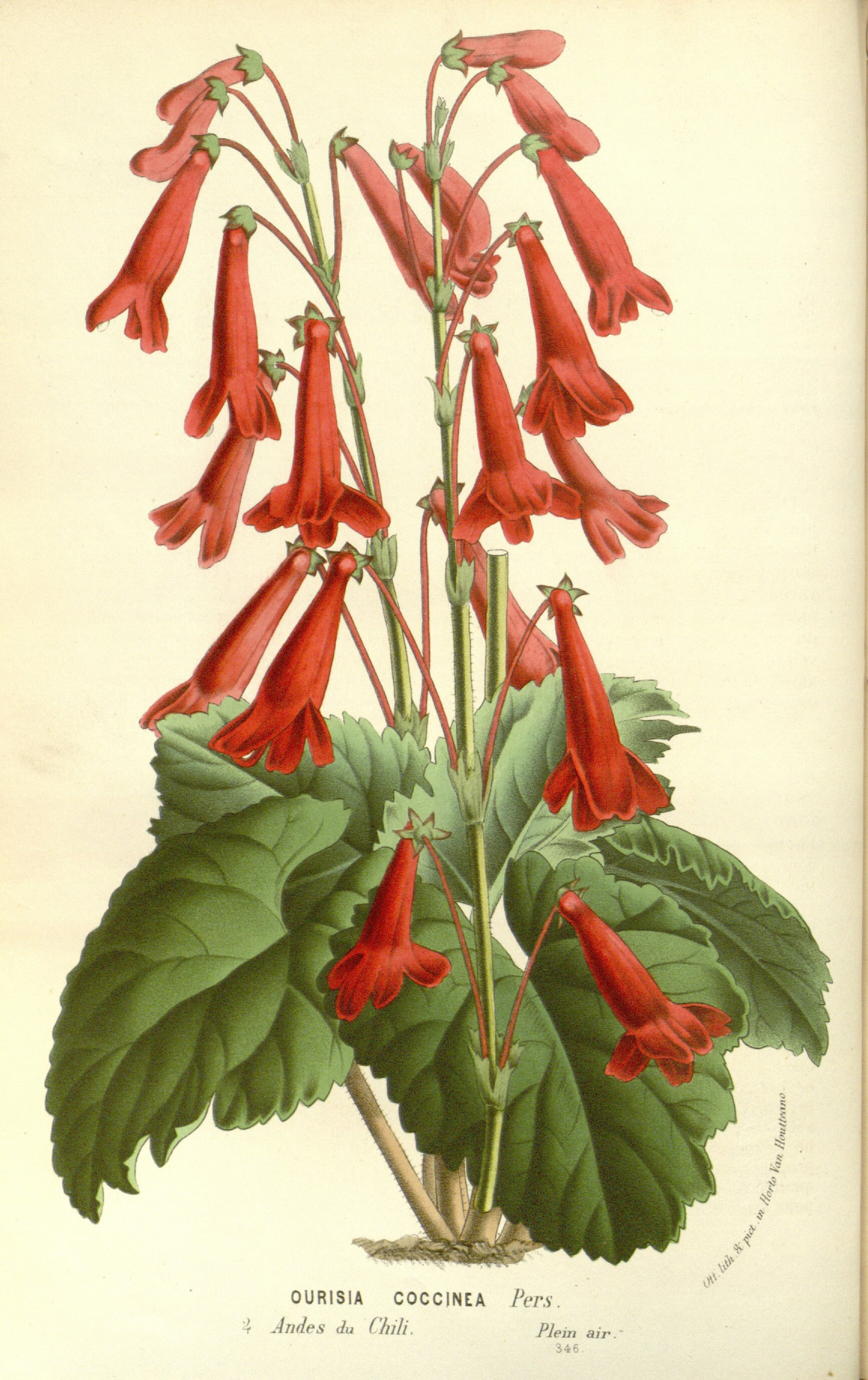
Colour illustration of O. coccinea

Ourisia coccinea plants are perennial, erect, rosette herbs. The short stems are 2.8–8.9 mm wide, and glabrous (hairless) or rarely hairy with long, non-glandular hairs. Leaves are tightly clustered in a subrosette or rosette, petiolate, 16.6–92.1 mm long by 14.2–74.3 mm wide (length: width ratio 0.8–1.7:1). Leaf petioles are 2–14 cm long and densely hairy with long non-glandular hairs. Leaf blades are narrowly ovate, ovate, broadly ovate, or very broadly ovate, widest below the middle, usually with a rounded apex, cordate or truncate base, and crenate or doubly crenate edges that are also sometimes lobed. Both surfaces of the leaves are glabrous or sparsely hairy with non-glandular hairs, and the underside is also punctate. Inflorescences are erect, with hairy racemes up to 53 cm long, and with 3–8 flowering nodes and up to 29 total flowers per raceme. Each flowering node has 1–2 flowers and 2 petiolate to sessile bracts that are oblanceolate to obovate or lanceolate to very broadly ovate. The bracts are similar to the leaves but smaller, 3.6–24.1 mm long and 1.1–13.3 mm wide and petiolate (lower bracts only) or sessile. The flowers are borne on a pedicel that is up to 85.2 mm long and is sparsely to densely hairy with tiny to long (<0.1 mm to 0.7 mm) glandular hairs. The calyx is 2.6–9.4 mm long, regular, with all 5 lobes equally divided to the base of the calyx, glabrous or sometimes hairy with a mix of non-glandular and glandular hairs on the outside of the calyx. The corolla is 30.9–35.0 mm long (including a 19.7–29.9 mm long corolla tube), straight or slightly curved, bilabiate, tubular-funnelform, red, with dark parallel striations, glabrous or hairy with tiny, sessile glandular hairs on the outside, and glabrous inside. The corolla lobes are 3.0–10.5 mm long, not spreading or only slightly spreading, sub-rectangular or rounded and deeply emarginate. There are 4 stamens which are didynamous, with two long stamens that are exserted, and two short stamens that reach the corolla tube opening or are included. The style is 20.1–30.6 mm long, exserted, with an emarginate or capitate stigma. The ovary is 3.5–4.3 mm long. Fruits are capsules with loculicidal dehiscence. The number of seeds in each capsule is unknown, and seeds are 0.6–1.2 mm long and 0.2–0.8 mm wide, elliptic, with a weakly two-layered (or sometimes one-layered) reticulate (having a net-like pattern) seed coat with thick, smooth, shallow, primary reticula.

Ourisia coccinea flowers and fruits from October to March.

The chromosome number of Ourisia coccinea is 2n = 16.

== Distribution and habitat ==
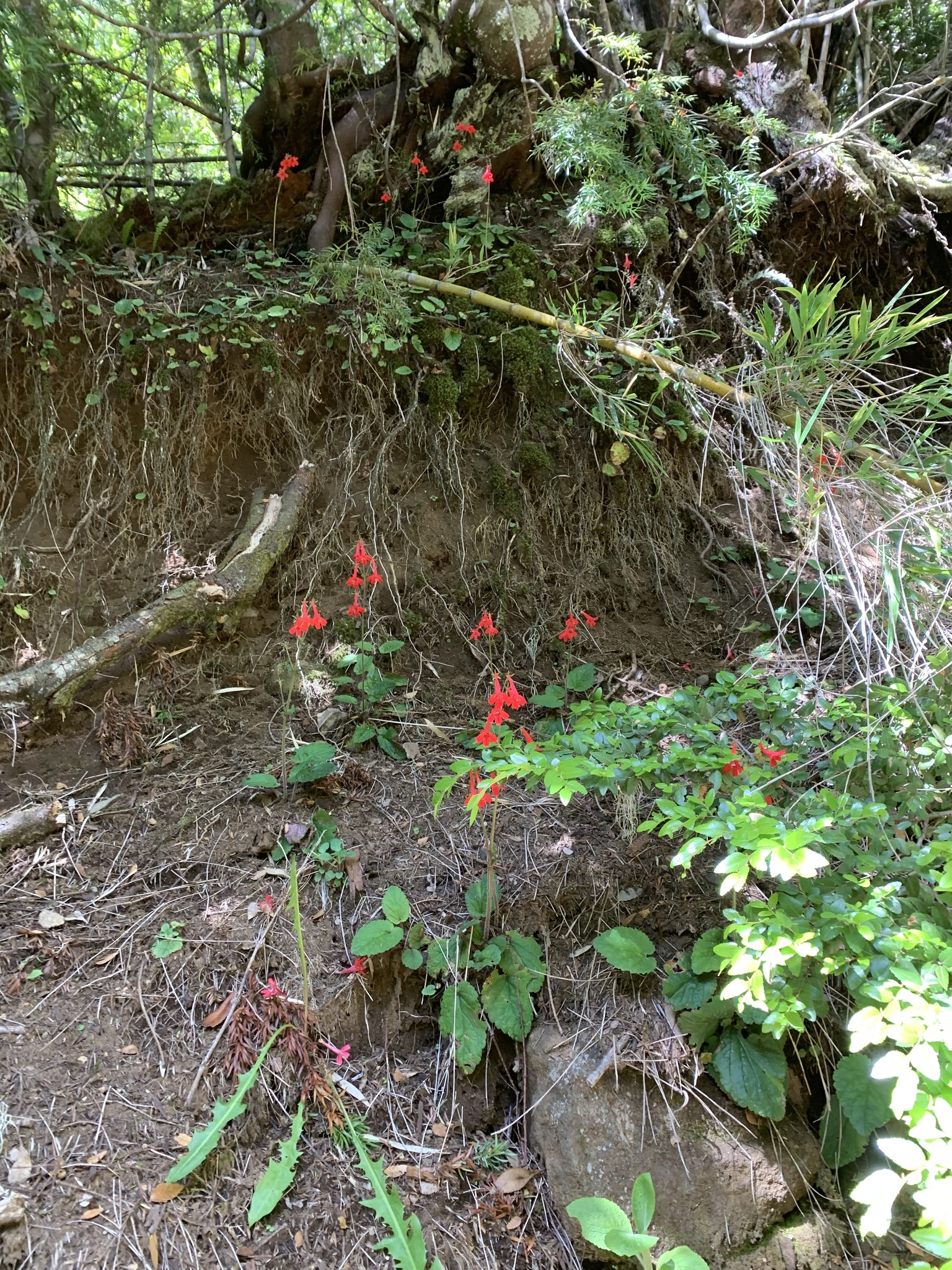
Shady forest habitat of O. coccinea

Ourisia coccinea is native to the Andes mountains of Chile and Argentina from approximately 31°S to 46°S latitude. In Chile it is found in the regions of Coquimbo, Santiago Metropolitan, O'Higgins, Maule, Ñuble, Biobío, Araucanía, Los Ríos, Los Lagos, and Aysén, and in Argentina it is found in the province of Neuquén. It is found from sea level to 2600 m elevation in rocky, wet habitats, including near running water, often in shady forests. It is the only species of Ourisia found on the island of Chiloé.

== Phylogeny ==
One individual of O. coccinea (subsp. elegans) was included in a phylogenetic analysis of all species of the genus Ourisia, using standard DNA sequencing markers (two nuclear ribosomal DNA markers and two chloroplast DNA regions) and morphological data. Ourisia coccinea was always placed with high support in the clade of Andean herbaceous species, and was always highly supported as the sister species to O. alpina.

== Ethnobotany ==
In the Mapuche language, Ourisia coccinea is called ehuelpué, which is translated into Spanish as "estómago con vómitos" referring to its use as a medicine for vomiting.

== Pollination ==
Although the flowers of O. coccinea fit the hummingbird pollination syndrome, suggesting ornithophily, and have abundant nectar, no hummingbirds were seen to visit this species during the course of one study on the island of Chiloé.

== Gallery ==
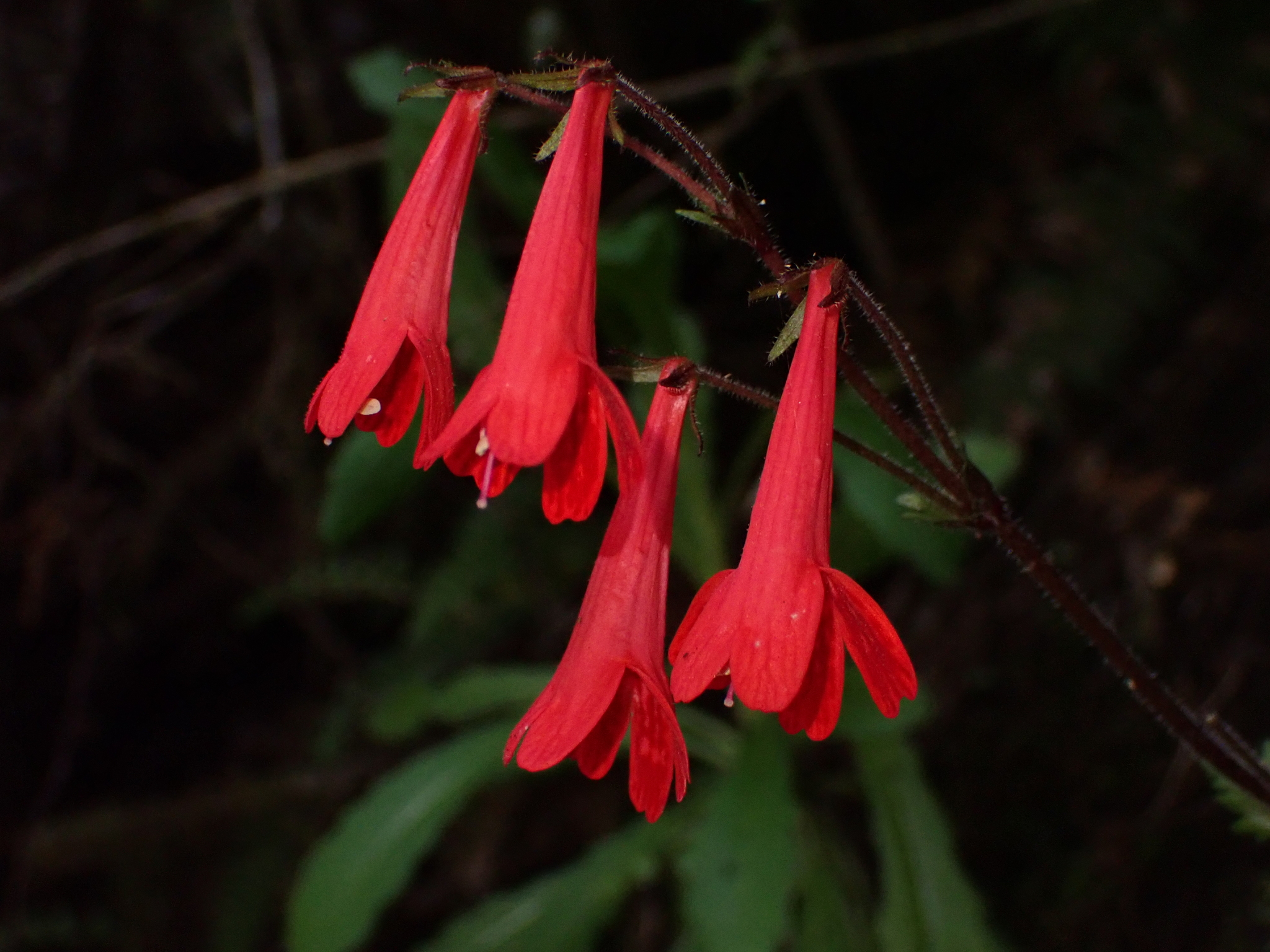
Red tubular flowers

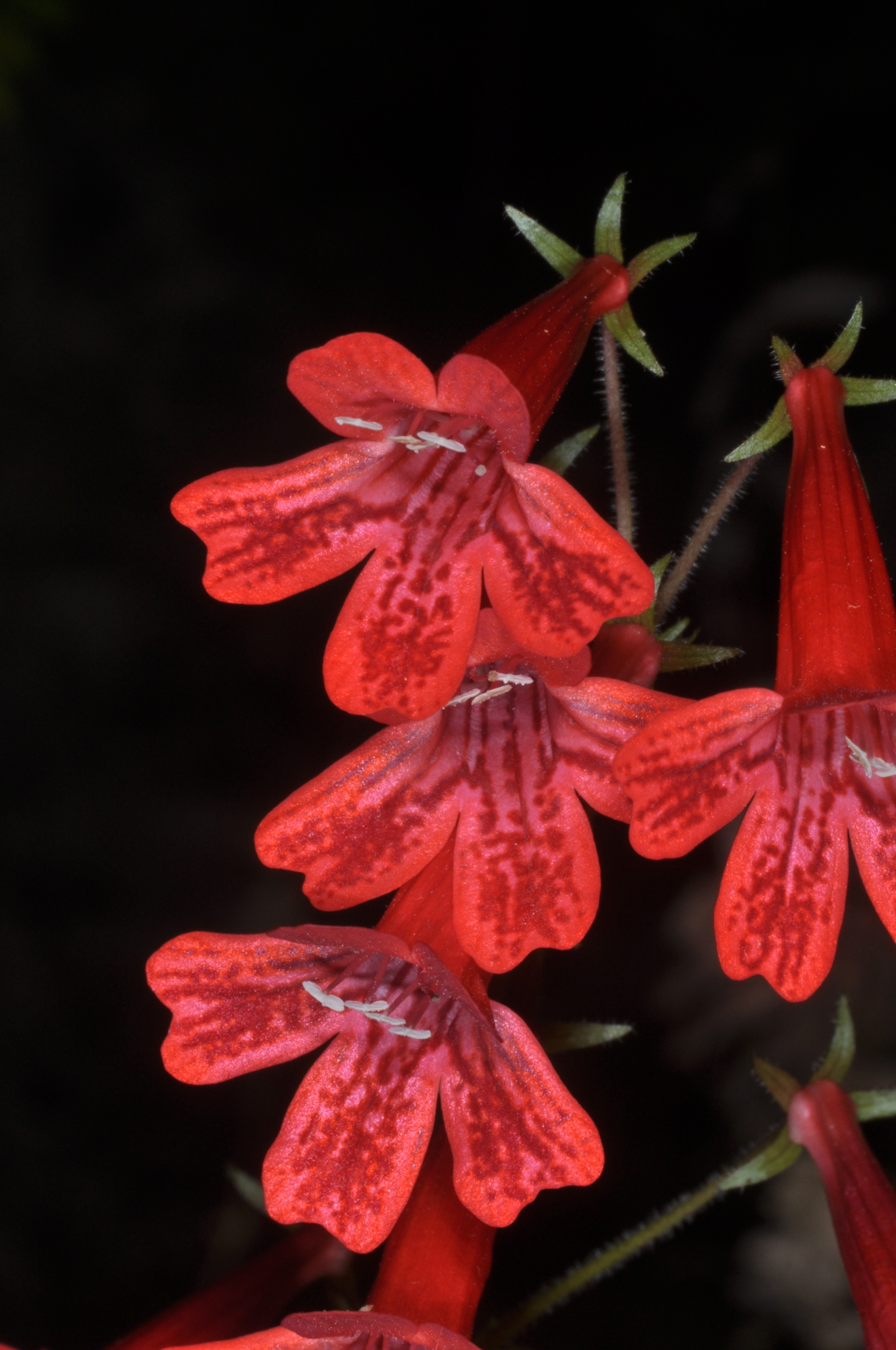
Corollas

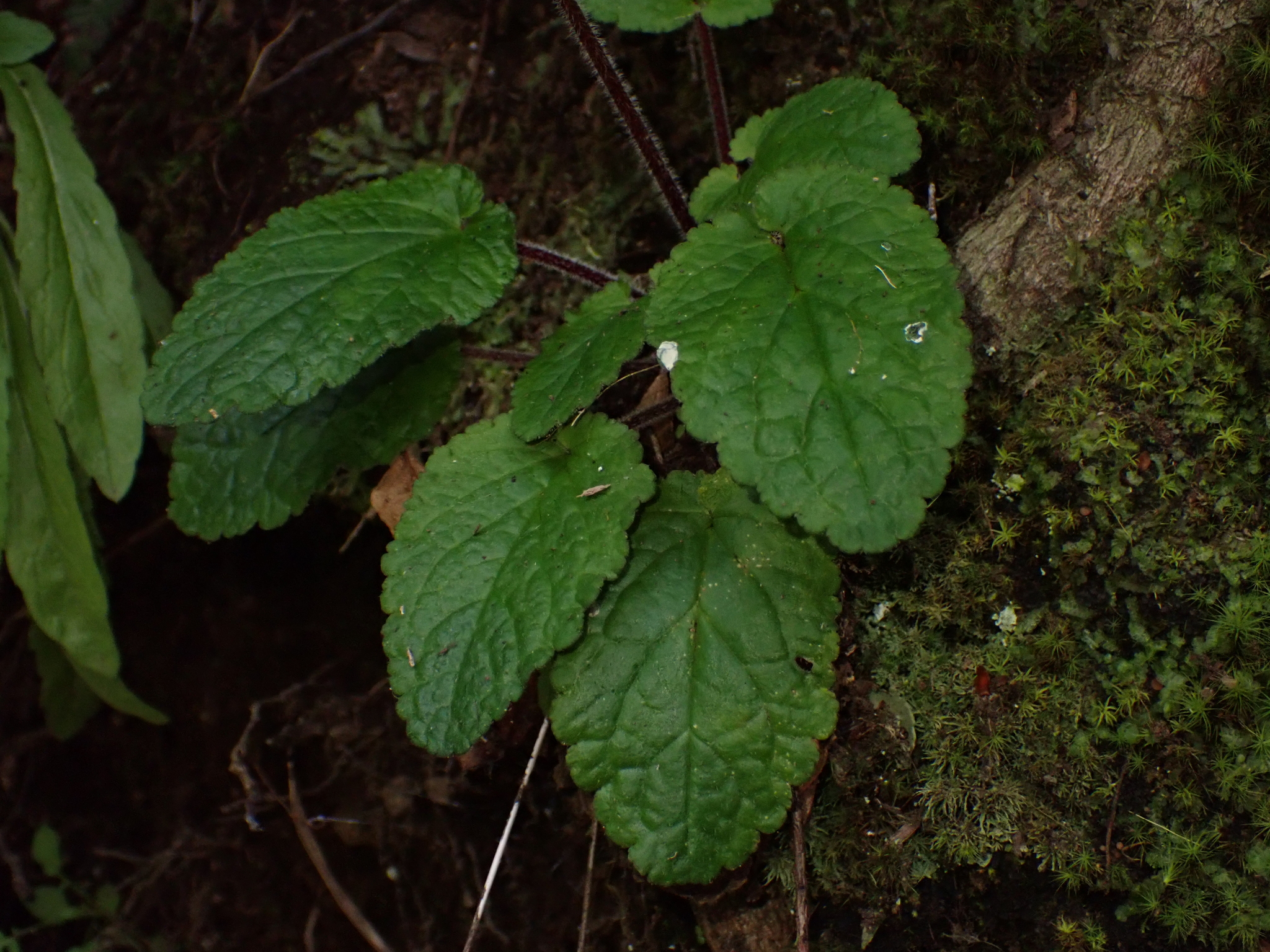
Leaves

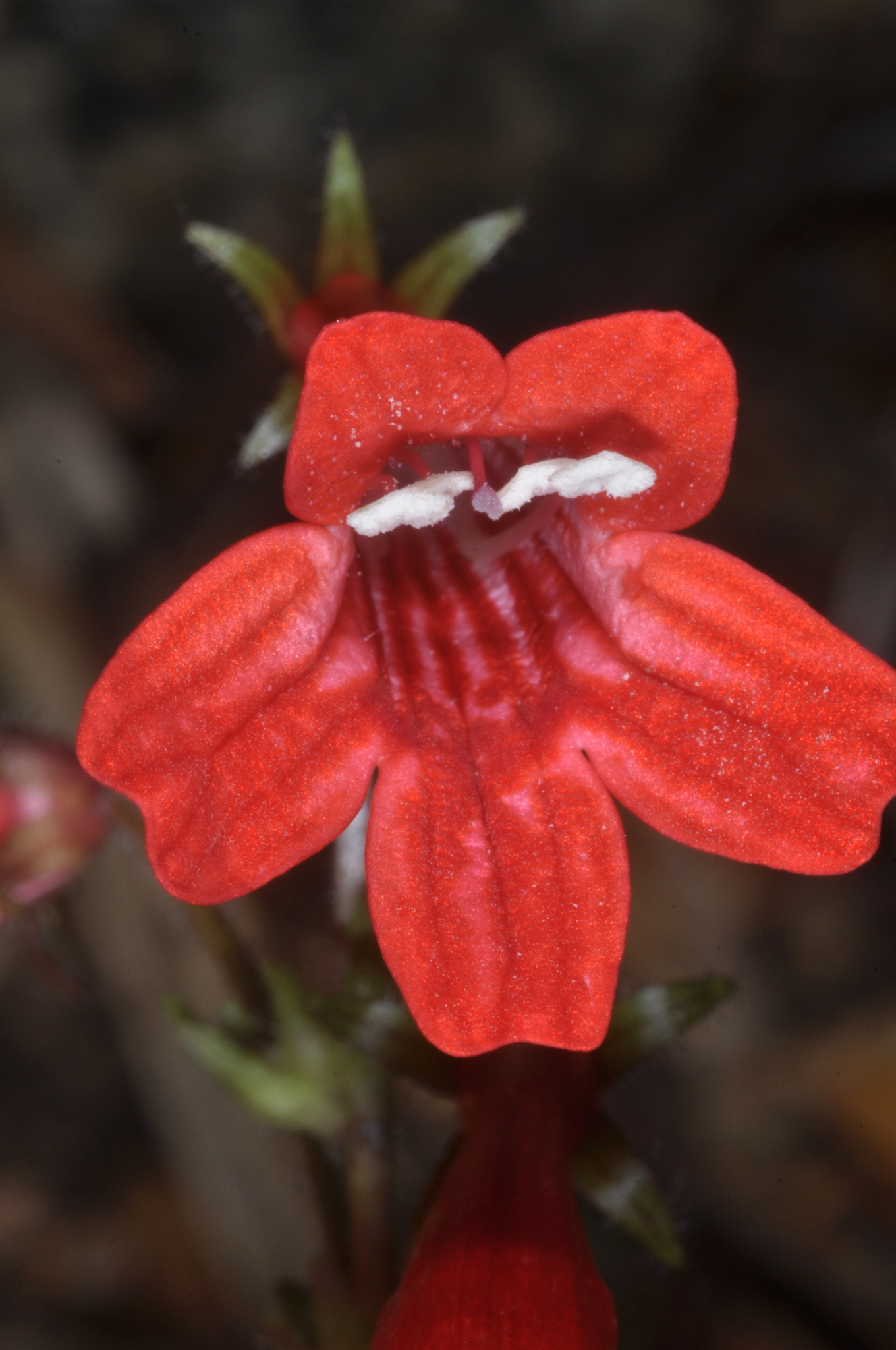
Corolla with stamens

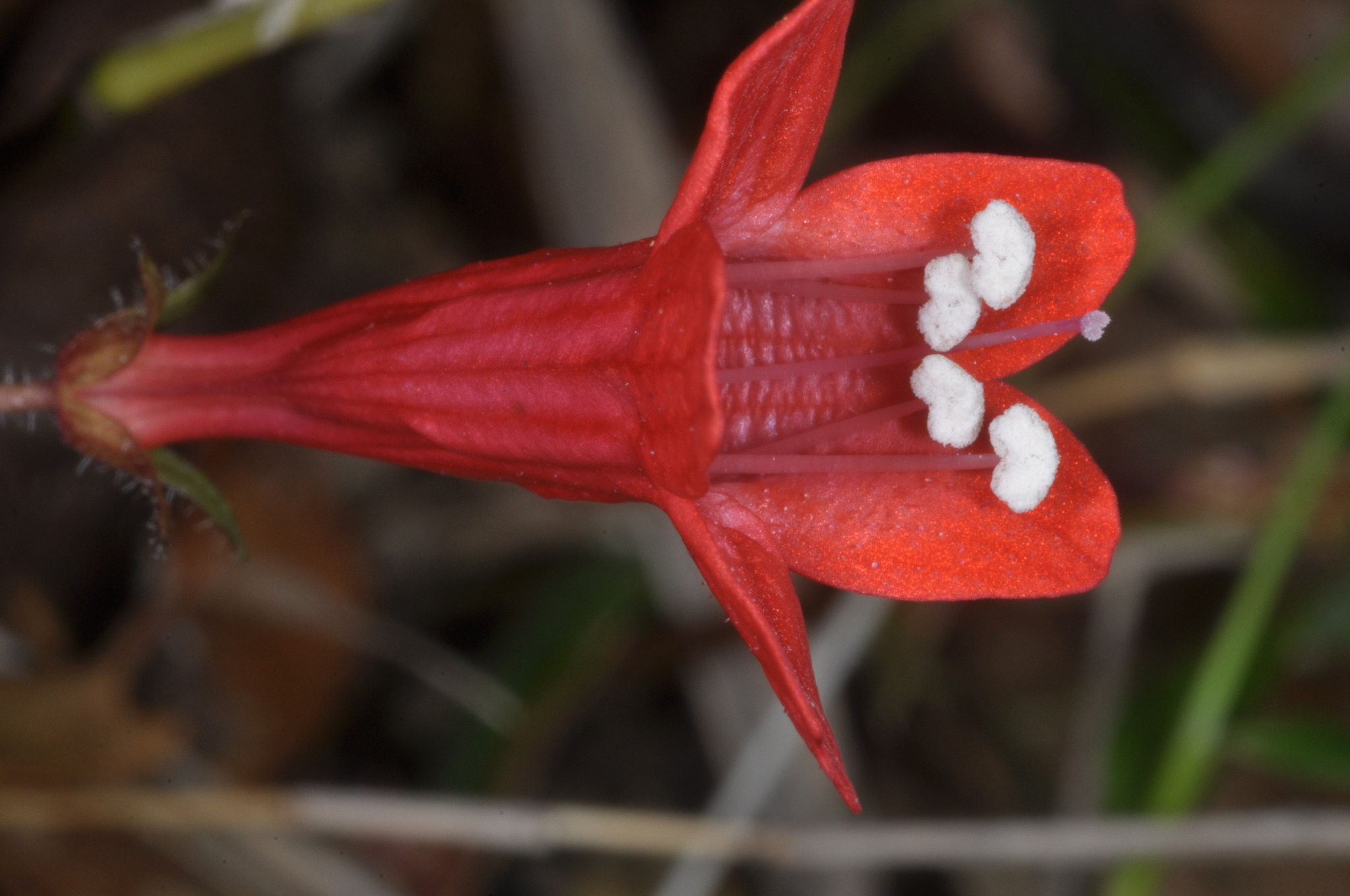
Corolla with stamens
