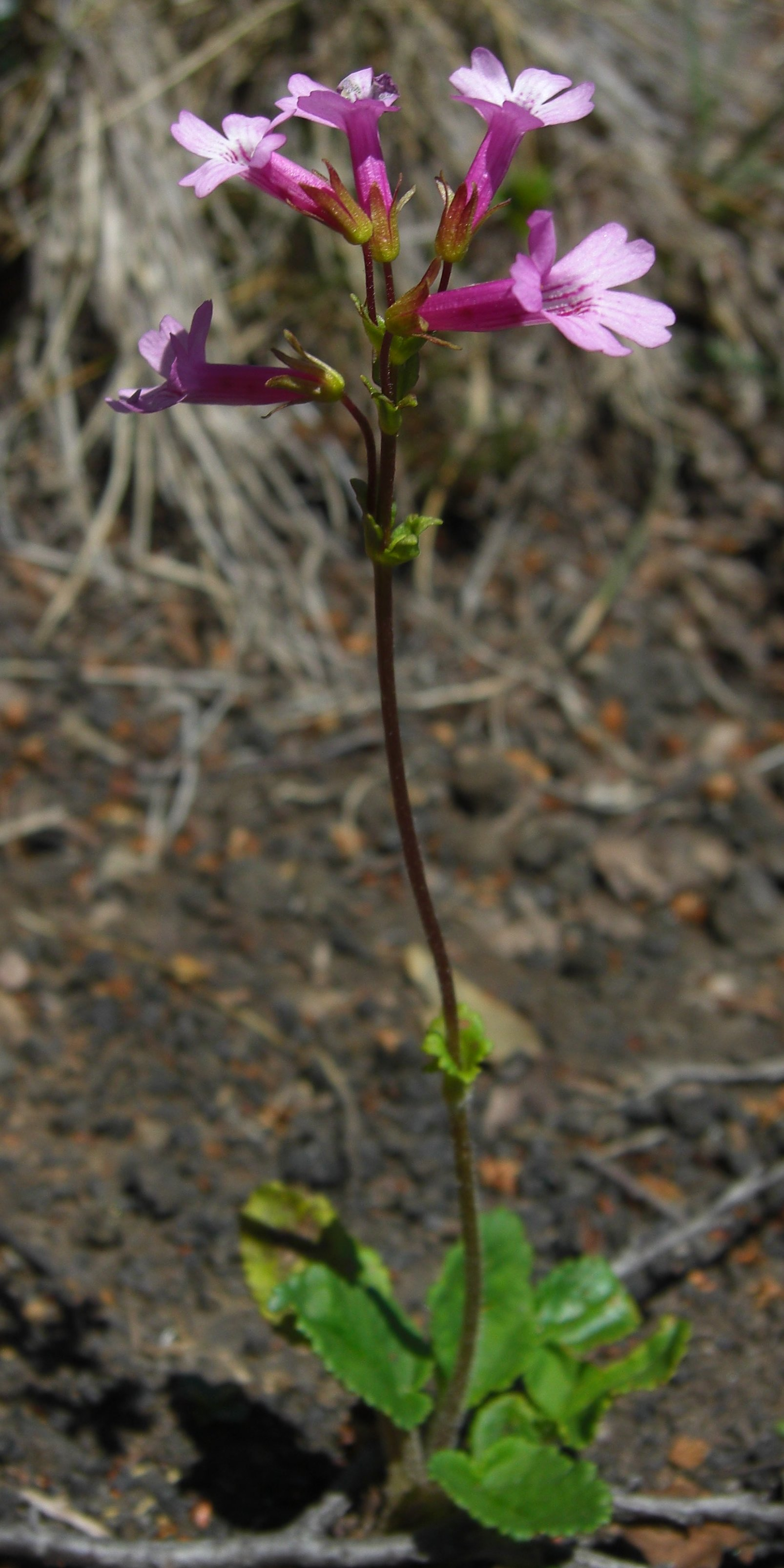
- Flowering plant of Ourisia alpina, Quetrupillán, Chile

Scientific classification
- Kingdom: Plantae
- Clade: Tracheophytes
- Clade: Angiosperms
- Clade: Eudicots
- Clade: Asterids
- Order: Lamiales
- Family: Plantaginaceae
- Genus: Ourisia
- Species: O. alpina

Binomial name
- Ourisia alpina Poepp. & Endl.

Synonyms
- Ourisia pallens Poepp. & Endl.; Ourisia rosea Phil.; Ourisia alpina var. glabra Phil.; Ourisia rancoana Phil.

= Ourisia alpina =

Species of flowering plant

Ourisia alpina is a species of flowering plant in the family Plantaginaceae that is endemic to mountainous habitats of the Andes of southern Chile and Argentina. Eduard Poeppig and Stephan Endlicher described O. alpina in 1835. Plants of this species of South American foxglove are perennial, rosette herbs mostly hairless, crenate leaves. There can be up to 20 flowers on a long, erect raceme, and each flower has a regular calyx, and a long, bilabiate, tubular-funnelform, light to dark pink or purple corolla with included stamens. The calyx and corolla are usually hairless or with some glandular hairs on the outside.

== Taxonomy ==
Ourisia alpina is in the plant family Plantaginaceae. German botanist Eduard Poeppig and Austrian botanist Stephan Endlicher described O. alpina in their book, Nova genera ac Species Plantarum, in 1835.

The type material was collected in the Chilean Biobío Region at Pico de Pilque. The lectotype was designated by Heidi Meudt and is located, together with two isolectotypes, at the Natural History Museum, Vienna (herbarium W), with additional isolectotypes at the Field Museum (herbarium F) and the Geneva Botanical Garden (herbarium G), among others.

Ourisia alpina is one of ten species of Ourisia in the southern Andes of Chile and Argentina, together with Ourisia breviflora, O. coccinea, O. fragrans, O. fuegiana, O. pygmaea, O. ruellioides, O. microphylla, O. polyantha and O. serpyllifolia. O. alpina and the first six species listed above are in the herbaceous subgenus Ourisia, whereas O. microphylla, O. polyantha and O. serpyllifolia are the only three species in the suffruticose subgenus Suffruticosa.

Ourisia alpina is most similar to O. coccinea in its strongly bilabiate corollas with dark lines, rosette habit, and regularly crenate leaves. O. alpina can be distinguished from O. coccinea by its smaller, pink corollas that are 1.1–2.2 cm long (vs longer, red corollas that are >2.7 cm long) and spreading corolla lobes (vs. not spreading in O. coccinea). Corolla colour can vary in O. alpina from white, to pale pink or purple, to dark pink, and in addition pink or purple lines, spots, veins or striations may also be present on the corollas.

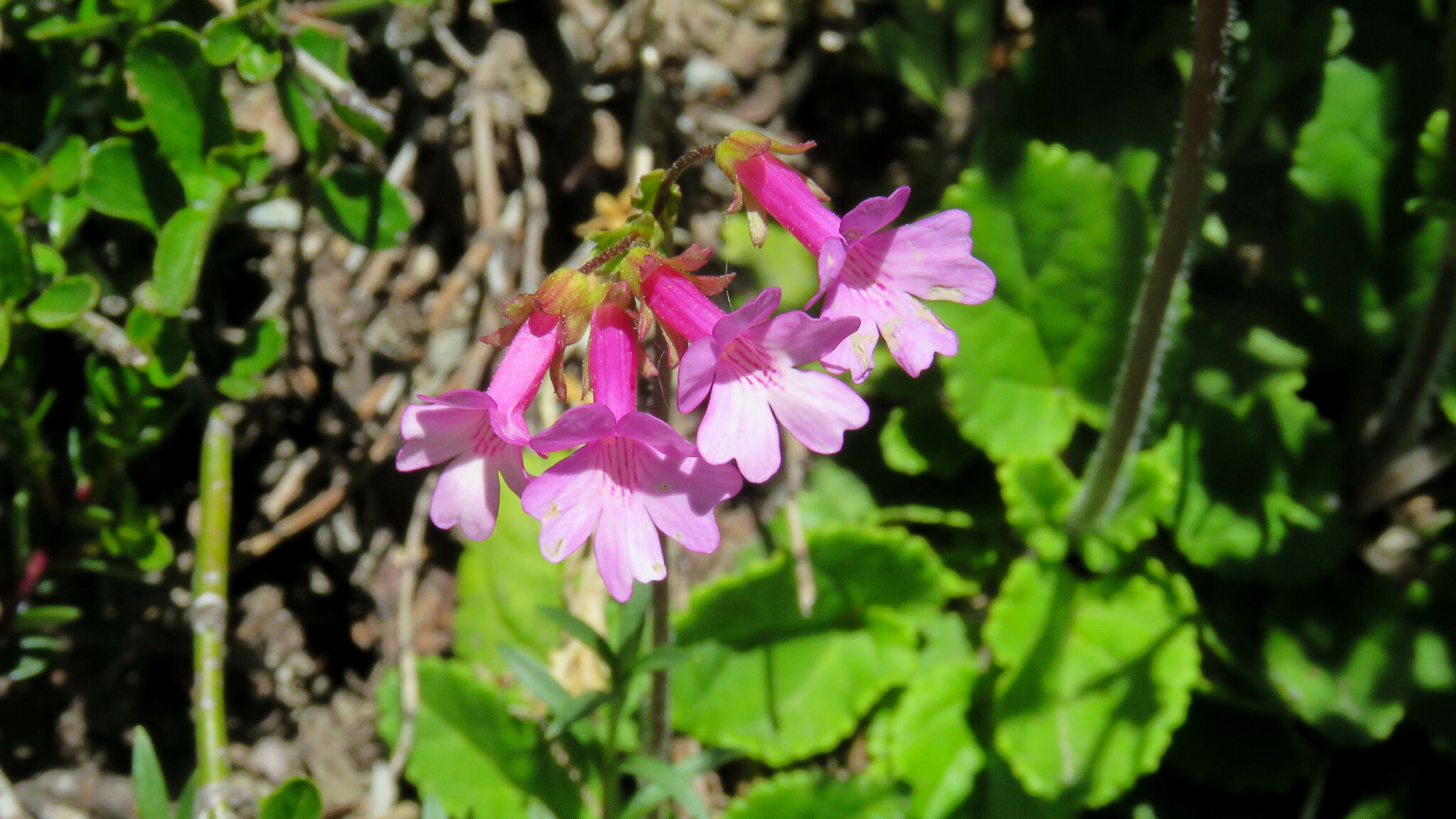
Pink corollas

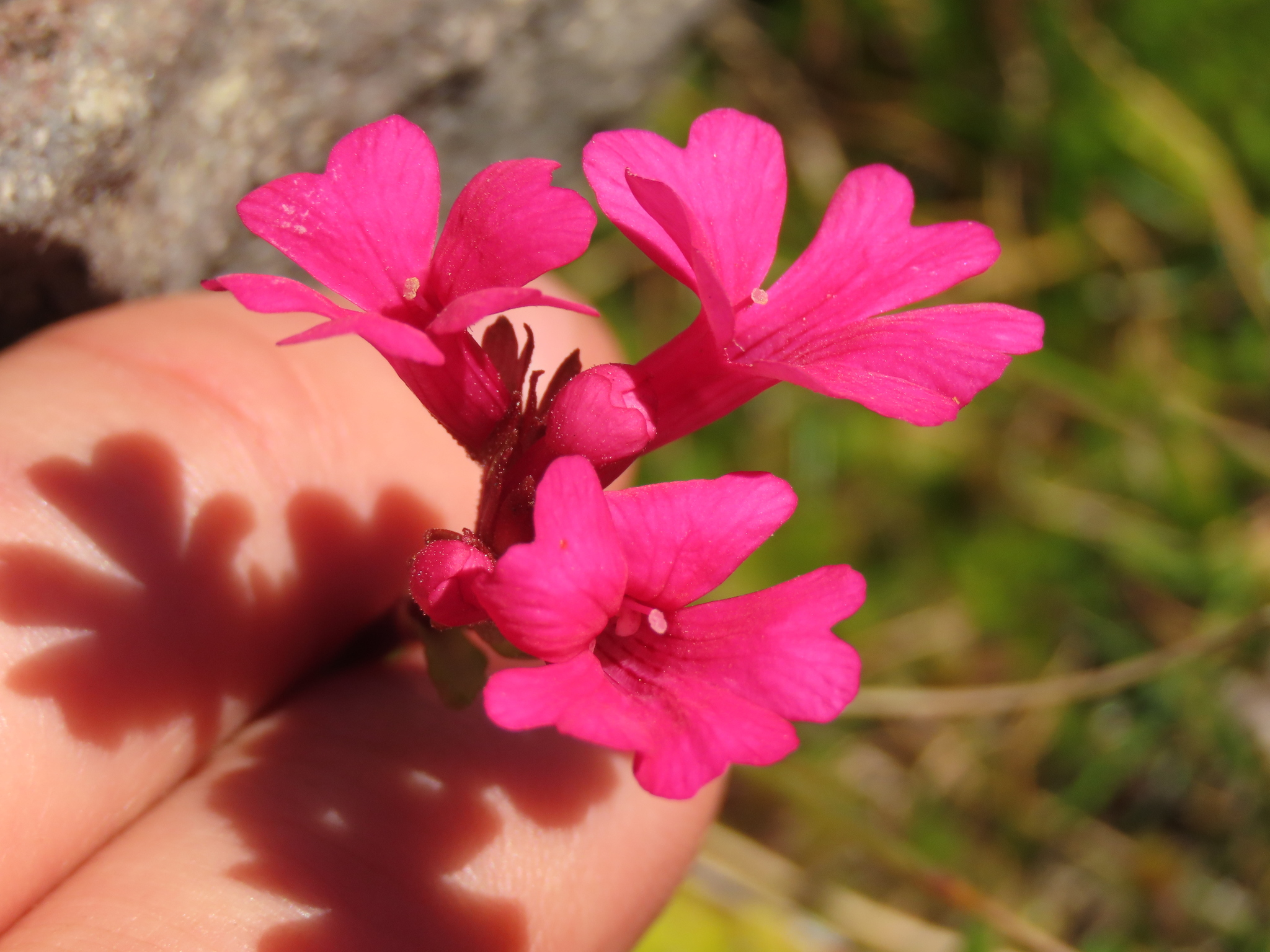
Dark pink corollas

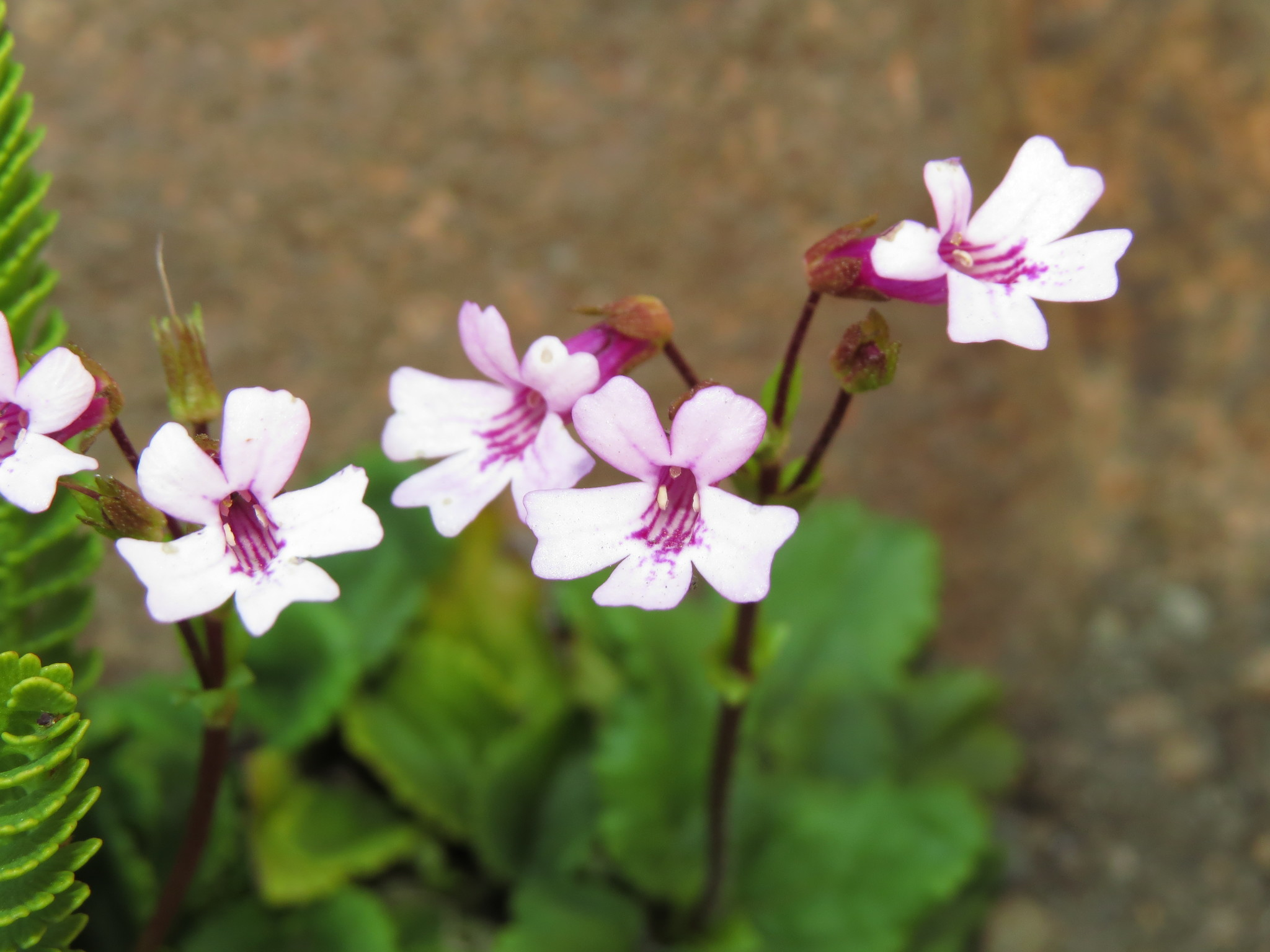
Light pink corollas with dark lines

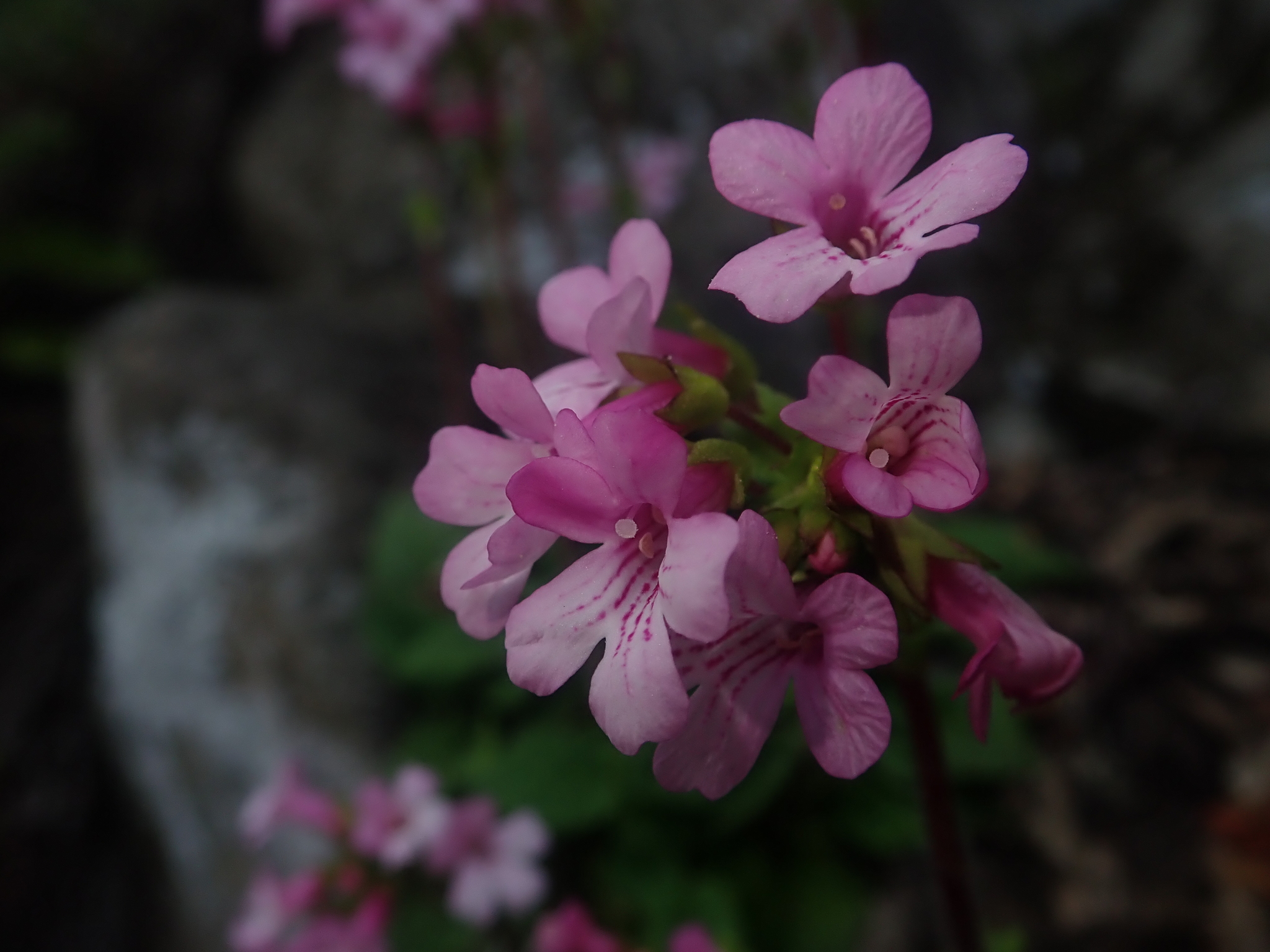
Pink corollas with dark lines

This variation in corolla colour has led to the naming of other taxa now considered synonyms of Ourisia alpina, including O. pallens described by Poeppig and Endlicher in the same publication as O. alpina and O. rosea described by German-Chilean botanist Rodolfo Amando Philippi in 1858. Philippi also later described O. alpina var. glabra in 1862 and O. rancoana in 1864, also now considered to be synoymys of O. alpina.

== Description ==
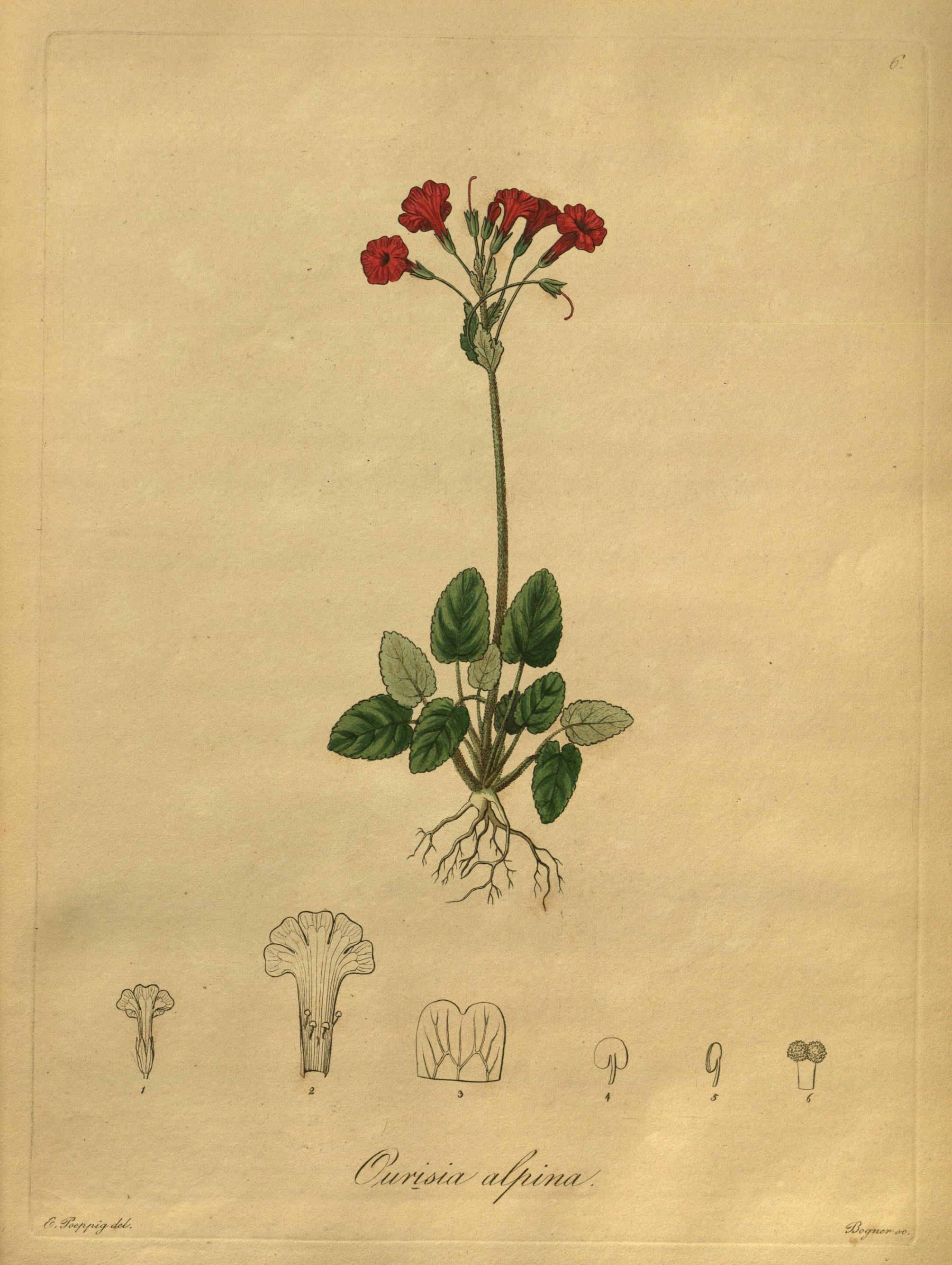
Botanical illustration of Ourisia alpina from the original description in 1835

Ourisia alpina plants are perennial, erect, rosette herbs. The short stems are 1.0–8.7 mm wide, and glabrous (hairless) orsometimes hairy with long, non-glandular hairs. Leaves are tightly clustered in a subrosette or rosette, petiolate, 9.1–27.4 mm long by 6.0–23.8 mm wide (length: width ratio 1.1–1.6:1). Leaf petioles are 3.5–74.6 mm long and densely hairy with long non-glandular hairs. Leaf blades are ovate, broadly ovate, or very broadly ovate, widest below the middle, with a rounded apex, cuneate or truncate base, and crenate or doubly crenate edges. Both surfaces of the leaves are mostly glabrous, but the underside is punctate and sparsely to densely hairy with long, non-glandular hairs on the leaf veins only. Inflorescences are erect, with hairy racemes up to 24.5 cm long, and with 1–6 flowering nodes and up to 20 total flowers per raceme. Each flowering node has 1–4 flowers and 2–4 sessile bracts that are narrowly ovate, ovate, broadly ovate, or obovate. The bracts are similar to the leaves but smaller, 3.7–12.6 mm long and 1.7–9.2 mm wide and sessile. The flowers are borne on a pedicel that is up to 26.0 mm long and is sparsely hairy with short glandular hairs. The calyx is 4.3–7.3 mm long, regular, with all 5 lobes equally divided to the base of the calyx, glabrous or sometimes hairy with glandular hairs on the outside of the calyx. The corolla is 14.2–16.0 mm long (including a 6.0–11.0 mm long corolla tube), straight, bilabiate, tubular or tubular-funnelform, pink, light purple or rarely white, with dark striations, glabrous or rarely hairy with tiny, sessile glandular hairs on the outside, and glabrous inside. The corolla lobes are 3.0–7.0 mm long, spreading, obcordate and deeply emarginate. There are 4 stamens which are didynamous, with two long stamens that are included, and two short stamens that are included. The style is 5.5–8.6 mm long, included or reaching the corolla tube opening, with an emarginate or capitate stigma. The ovary is 1.5–3.3 mm long. Fruits are capsules with loculicidal dehiscence. The number of seeds in each capsule is unknown, and seeds are 0.6–0.9 mm long and c. 0.4 mm wide, elliptic, with a two-layered reticulate (having a net-like pattern) seed coat with thick, smooth, shallow, primary reticula and regular secondary reticula.

Ourisia alpina flowers from November to May and fruits from December to March.

The chromosome number of Ourisia alpina is unknown.

== Distribution and habitat ==
Ourisia alpina is native to the Andes mountains of Chile and Argentina from approximately 34°S to 42°S latitude. In Chile it is found in the regions of Maule, Ñuble, Biobío, Araucanía, Los Ríos and Los Lagos, and in Argentina it is found in the provinces of Mendoza, Neuquén and Río Negro. It is relatively common from 1000 to 2700 m above sea level in rocky, wet habitats above the tree line.

== Phylogeny ==
One individual of O. alpina was included in a phylogenetic analysis of all species of the genus Ourisia, using standard DNA sequencing markers (two nuclear ribosomal DNA markers and two chloroplast DNA regions) and morphological data. Ourisia alpina was always placed with high support in the clade of Andean herbaceous species, and was always highly supported as the sister species to O. coccinea.

== Gallery ==
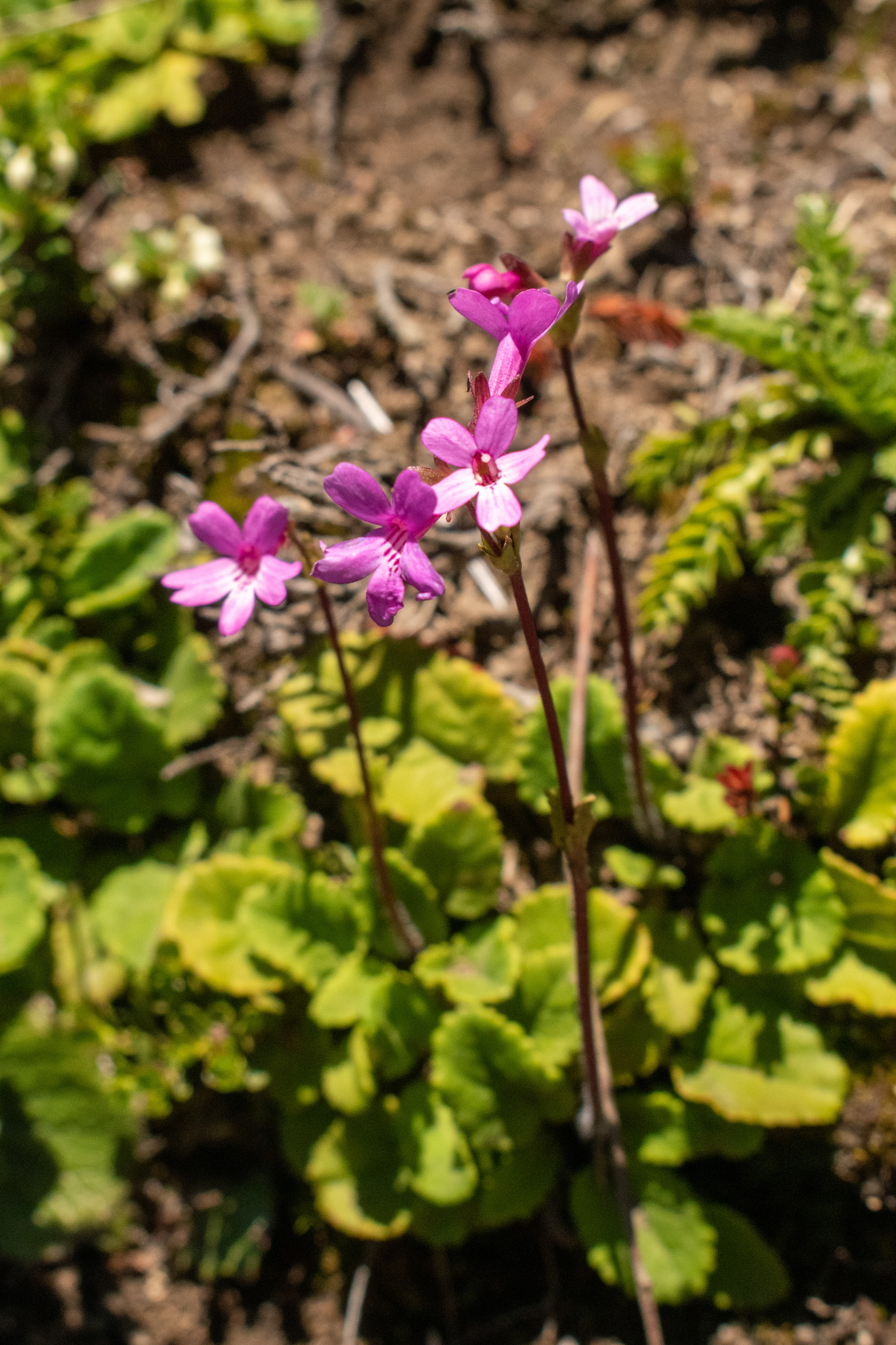
Habit

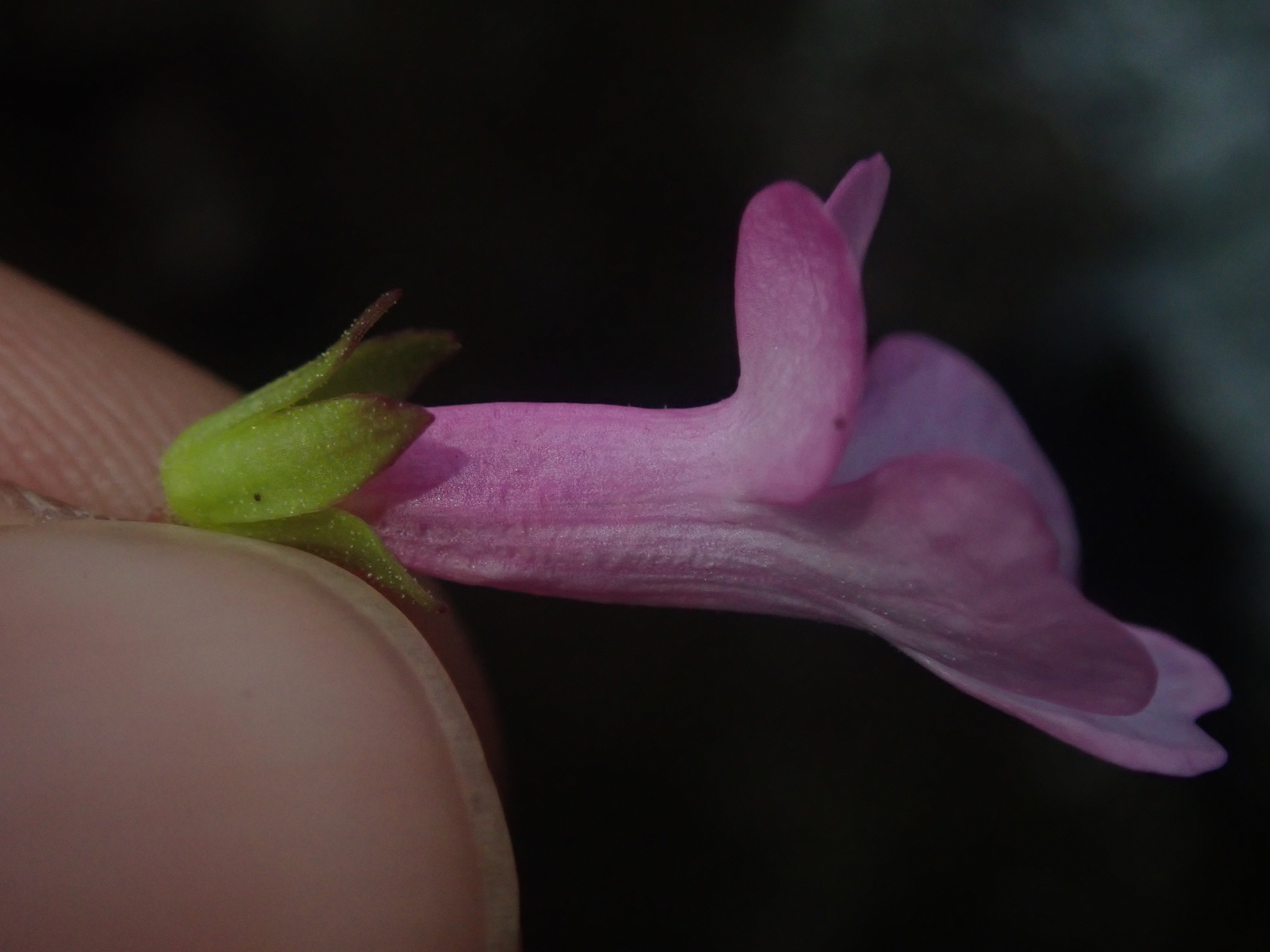
Side view of corolla and calyx

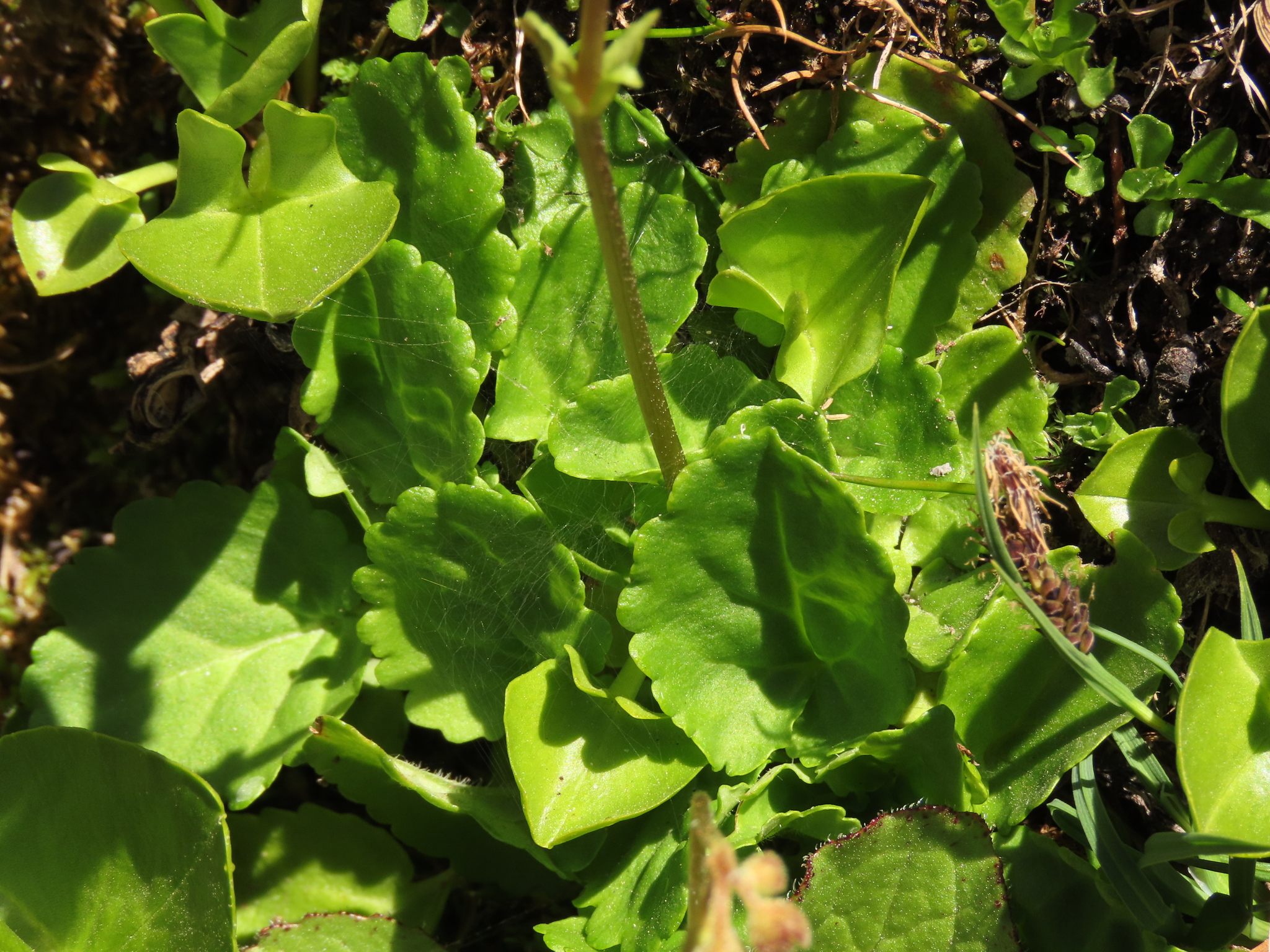
Rosette leaves

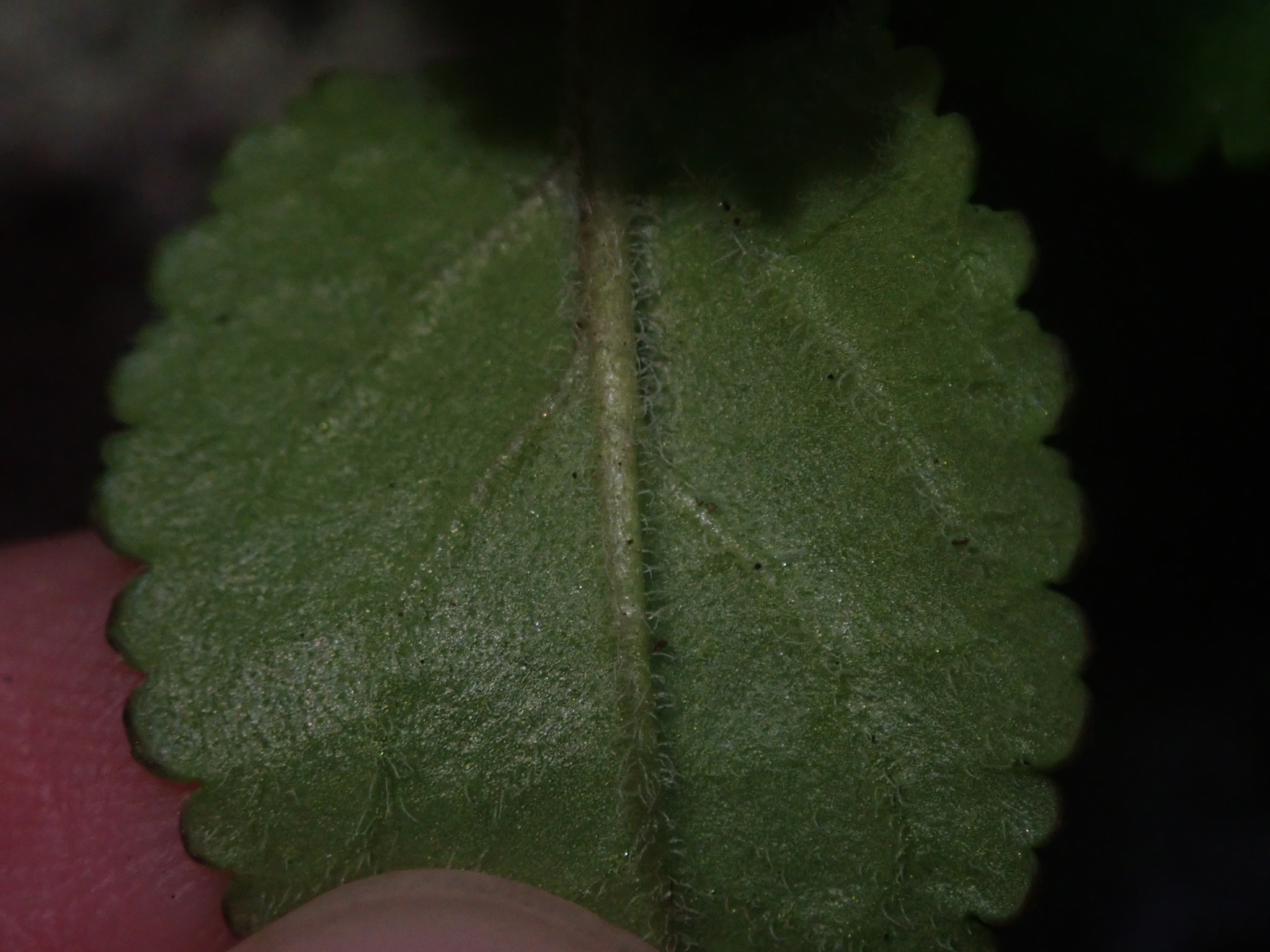
Close up of underside of leaf

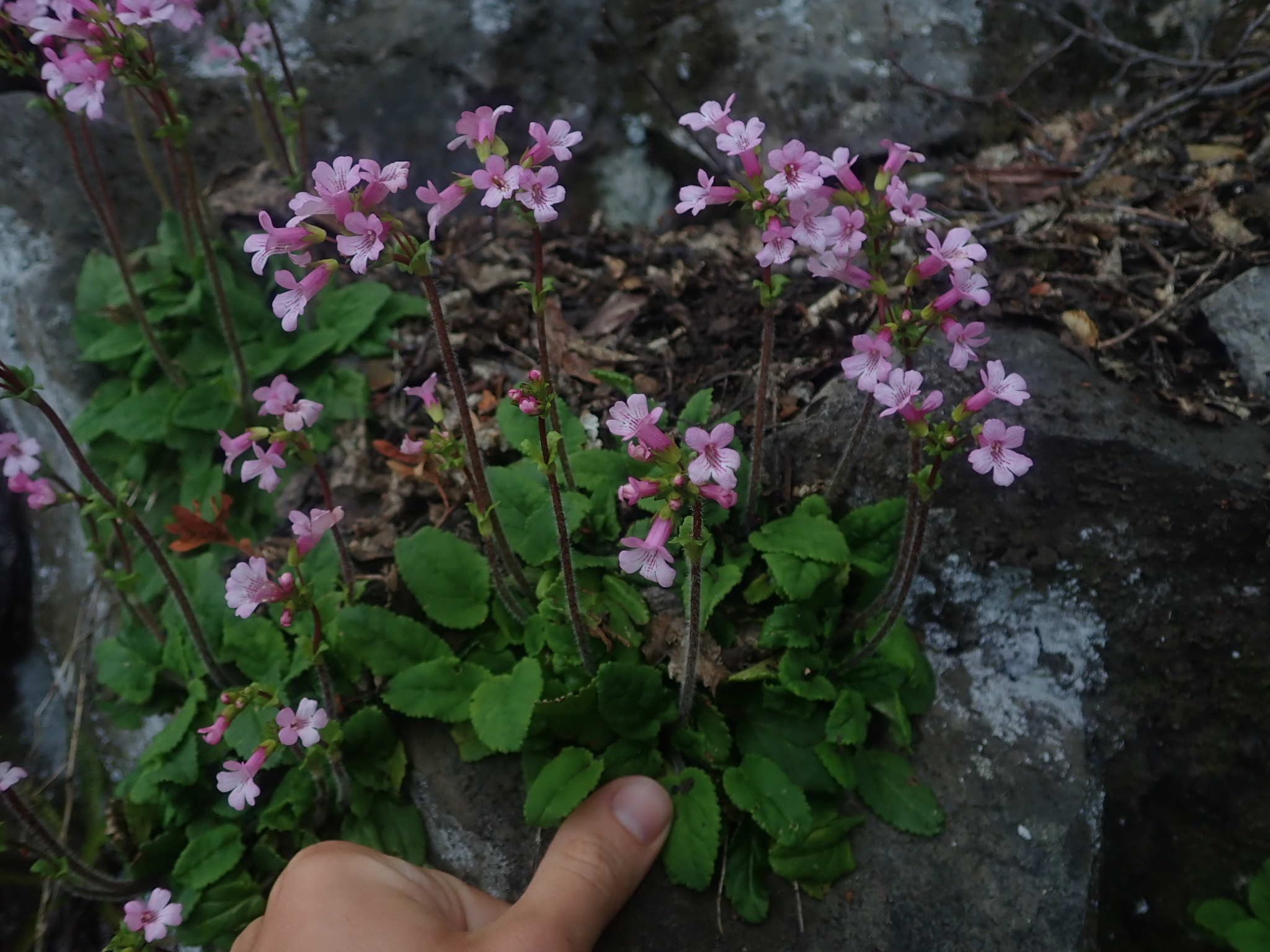
Habit
