= Florencia (given name) =

- Gender: Female
- Language: Spanish language, Latin

Origin
- Meaning: flowering, in bloom

Florencia (Spanish pronunciation: [floˈɾensja]) is a female given name of Latin origin, Florentia meaning flowering. It is very popular in Argentina, but also in the Hispanophone.

Notable people with the name include:

- Florencia Abbate (born 1976), Argentine writer
- Florencia Aimone (born 1990), Argentine handball player
- Florencia Bécquer (1910–1994), Argentine actress
- Florencia Bertotti (born 1983), Argentine actress and singer
- Florencia Bonsegundo (born 1993), Argentine footballer
- Florencia Borelli (born 1992), Argentine runner
- Florencia Busquets (born 1989), Argentine volleyball player
- Florencia Carlotto (born 1988), Argentine volleyball player
- Florencia Caserta (born 1984), Argentine singer
- Florencia Cerutti (born 1982), Argentine sailor
- Florencia De Sensi (born 1988), Argentine politician
- Florencia de la V (born 1975), Argentine actress, comedian and vedette
- Florencia del Campo (born 1982), Argentine writer
- Florencia Fabris (1975–2013), Argentine soprano
- Florencia Giorgi (born 1995), Argentine volleyball player
- Florencia Gutiérrez (born 1970), Argentine windsurfer
- Florencia Habif (born 1993), Argentine field hockey player
- Florencia Klipauka Lewtak (born 1993), Argentine politician
- Florencia Iriondo, Argentine-American playwright, composer, actor and singer
- Florencia Labat (born 1971), Argentine tennis player
- Florencia Lampreabe (born 1982), Argentine politician
- Florencia López (born 1979), Argentine politician
- Florencia Lozano (born 1969), American actress
- Florencia Luna (born 1962), Argentine doctor of philosophy
- Florencia Mandrile (born 1988), Argentine footballer
- Florencia Molinero (born 1988), Argentine tennis player
- Florencia Mutio (born 1984), Argentine field hockey player
- Florencia Peña (born 1974), Argentine actress
- Florencia Ponce de Leon (born 1992), Argentine handball player
- Florencia Quiñones (born 1986), Argentine football manager and former player
- Florencia Raitzin-Legrand, Argentine pianist
- Florencia Romano (born 1970), Argentine football referee
- Florencia Sánchez Morales (1923–2018), Mexican caretaker
- Florencia Szigeti (born 1981), Argentine swimmer
- Florencia Zaccanti, Argentine model

== Middle name ==
- Luana Florencia Muñoz (born 1999), Argentine footballer
- María Florencia Botto (born 1974), Argentine actress
- María Florencia Manfredi (born 1982), Argentine equestrian athlete
- María Florencia Moreno (born 1990), Argentine wheelchair tennis player
- Paola Florencia Carosella (born 1972), Argentine-Brazilian cook
