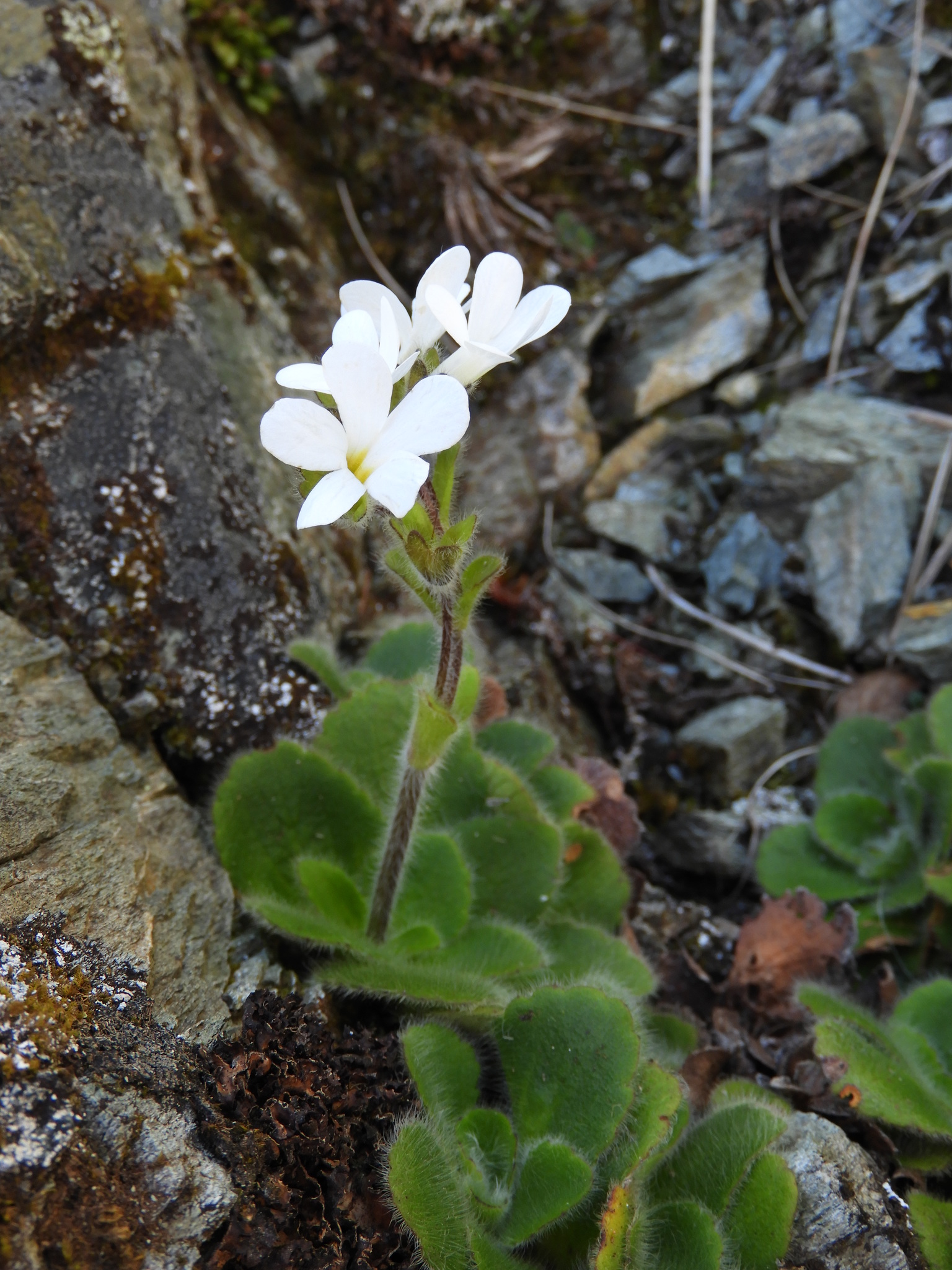
- Flowering O. spathulata observed in Southland, South Island, New Zealand

Conservation status
- Naturally Uncommon (NZ TCS)

Scientific classification
- Kingdom: Plantae
- Clade: Tracheophytes
- Clade: Angiosperms
- Clade: Eudicots
- Clade: Asterids
- Order: Lamiales
- Family: Plantaginaceae
- Genus: Ourisia
- Species: O. spathulata

Binomial name
- Ourisia spathulata Arroyo

= Ourisia spathulata =

Species of flowering plant

Ourisia spathulata is a species of flowering plant in the family Plantaginaceae that is endemic to high-elevation habitats in Southland on the South Island of New Zealand. Mary Kalin Arroyo described O. spathulata in 1984. Plants of this species of New Zealand mountain foxglove are perennial, small-leaved herbs that are covered in a mixture of glandular and non-glandular hairs. They have velvety, hairy, crenate, spathulate leaves that are oppositely arranged and tightly packed along the creeping stem. The flowers are single or in pairs in each node, with a zygomorphic calyx and corolla. The corolla is white and the corolla tube is glabrous and yellow inside. It is listed as At Risk - Naturally Uncommon.

== Taxonomy ==
Ourisia spathulata Arroyo is in the plant family Plantaginaceae. Mary Kalin Arroyo described O. confertifolia in 1984.

The type material was collected by David Given in the Eyre Mountains, Southland, South Island, New Zealand. The holotype is housed at the Allan Herbarium of Manaaki Whenua – Landcare Research.

Ourisia spathulata is morphologically similar to other New Zealand small-leaved species, namely O. sessilifolia, O. simpsonii, and O. confertifolia, with which it shares irregular white corollas and having a mixture of glandular and non-glandular hairs on many plant parts.

O. spathulata can be distinguished from O. sessilifolia by its non-rosette habit (vs. rosette), obovate or spathulate leaves (vs ovate to broadly ovate), very long glandular hairs on the upper side of the leaf (vs. absent or short glandular hairs), hairy leaves on the underside (vs. glabrous), irregular calyces (vs. regular), corolla tube that is yellow and glabrous (hairless) inside (vs. purple and with 1 or 3 lines of hairs inside), and flowers and bracts in pairs only (vs. sometimes in whorls).

O. spathluata can be distinguished from O. confertifolia by its leaves found along the stem (vs. rosette habit), leaves very densely glandular-hairy with a velvety appearance on the upper side (vs. a silky appearance on the upper side), and usually longer inflorescences ( > 10 cm long vs. < 9 cm long).

== Description ==
Ourisia spathulata plants are perennial herbs. The stems are creeping, with leaves usually tightly packed and opposite or sometimes forming subrosettes. Leaf petioles are 3.8–21.8 mm long. Leaf blades are 7.6–29.4 mm long by 7.0–20.3 mm wide (length: width ratio 1.0–1.4: 1), spathulate, obovate to very broadly obovate, widest above the middle, with a rounded apex, cuneate base and obscurely and regularly crenate edges. Leaves are densely hairy and velvety with a mixture of long glandular and non-glandular hairs on the upper surface, and densely hairy with short to long glandular hairs on the lower surface (rarely with non-glandular hairs also mixed in), and with prominent veins on the lower surface. Inflorescences are erect, densely hairy racemes up to 190 mm long, with a mixture of glandular and non-glandular hairs, and with 1–4 flowering nodes and up to 8 total flowers per raceme. Each flowering node has 1–2 flowers and 2 sessile, sometimes clasping bracts that are oblanceolate to narrowly obovate. The lowest bracts are similar to the leaves, 8.7–14.5 mm long and 3.1–6.1 mm wide, and become smaller toward the apex of the raceme. The flowers are borne on a densely hairy pedicel that is up to 24 mm long and has a mixture of glandular and non-glandular hairs. The calyx is 6.4–9.1 mm long, irregular, with 3 lobes divided to one-third to two-thirds the length of the calyx and 2 divided to near the base, and densely hairy with a mixture of glandular and non-glandular hairs (or sometimes lacking non-glandular hairs). The corolla is 18.6–23.8 mm long (including the 7.5–13.6 mm long corolla tube), bilabiate, tubular-funnelform, glabrous and white on the outside, and glabrous and yellow on the inside. The corolla lobes are 4.3–11.1 mm long, spreading, and usually obovate. There are 4 stamens up to 7.0 mm long which are didynamous, with two long stamens included inside the corolla, and 2 short stamens included inside the corolla; a short staminode 0.3–0.7 mm long is also present. The style is 4.2–5.3 mm long, included inside the corolla tube or slightly exserted, with an emarginate to rounded stigma. The ovary is 3.2–3.8 mm long and glabrous. Fruits are capsules 4.5–7.1 mm long and 3.3–4.8 mm wide with loculicidal dehiscence and pedicels up to 21.6 mm long. The number of seeds in each capsule is unknown, 0.6–1.0 mm long; the seed coat has not been examined.

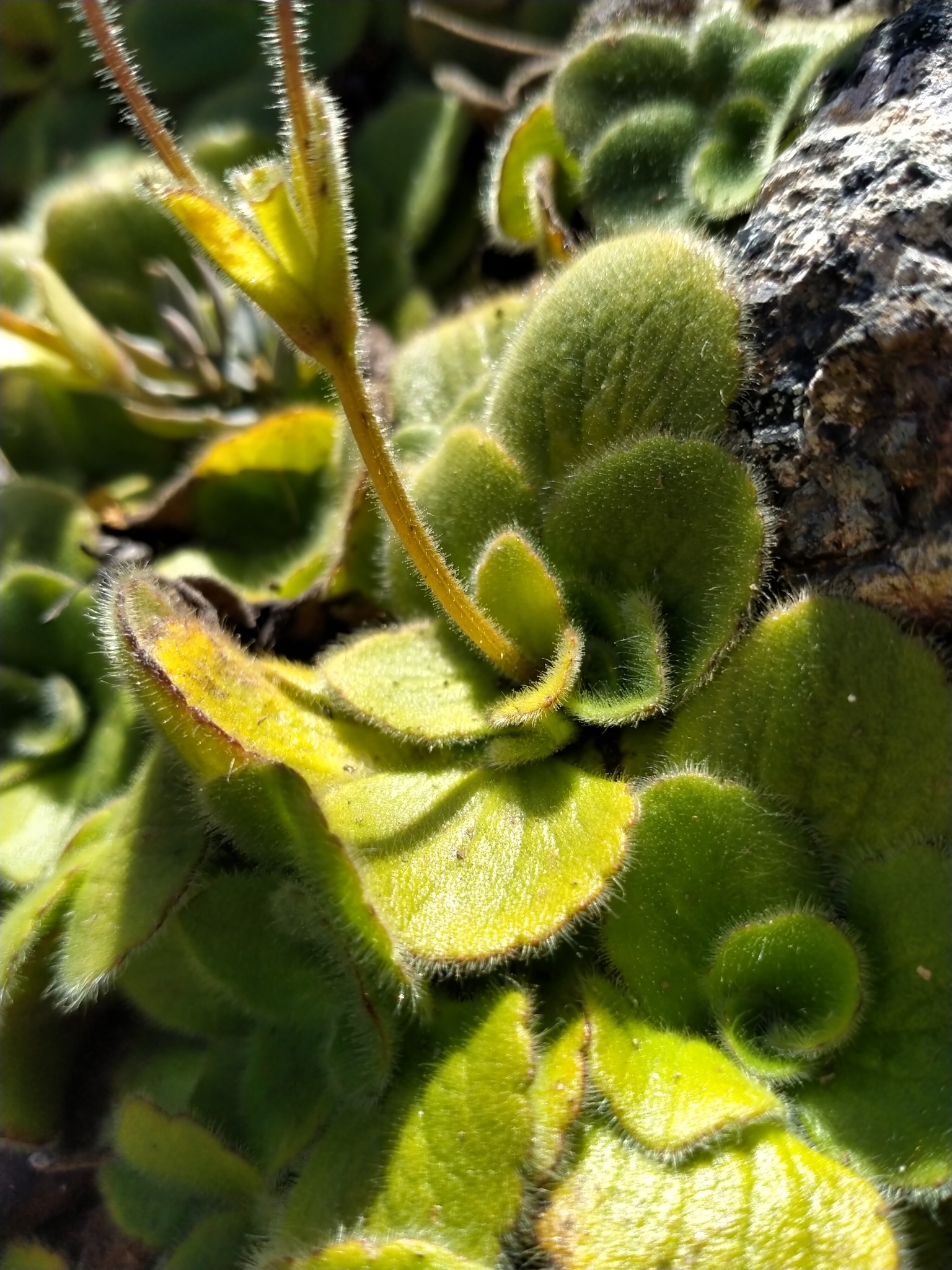
Close up of peduncle and leaves showing mixture of long glandular and non-glandular hairs

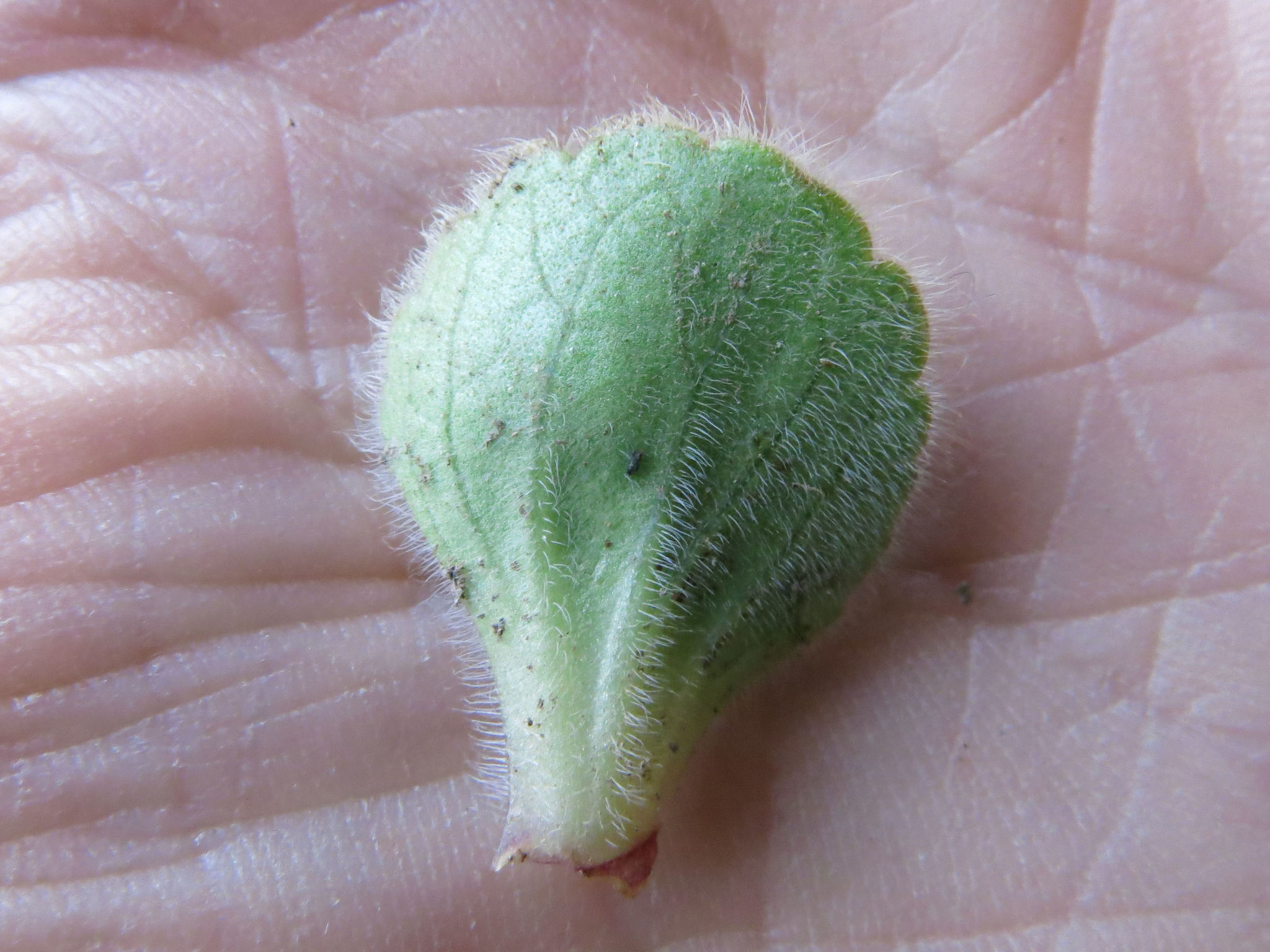
Hairs and prominent veins on the underside of the leaf

Ourisia spathulata flowers from November to January and fruits from January to March.

The chromosome number of Ourisia spathulata is 2n=48.

== Distribution and habitat ==
Ourisia spathulata is a New Zealand mountain foxglove that is endemic to the South Island of New Zealand. It is found only in northern Southland in high-elevation habitats in herbfields, grasslands or rocky, shaded and often dry habitats from 1,200 to 1,430 m (3,940 to 4,690 ft) above sea level in the Thomson, Livingstone, and Eyre Mountains, and on East Dome.

== Phylogeny ==
An individual of O. spathulata was included in phylogenetic analyses of all species of the genus Ourisia using standard DNA sequencing markers (two nuclear ribosomal DNA markers and two chloroplast DNA regions) and morphological data. In all analyses, the sampled individual belonged to the highly supported New Zealand lineage, and in the nuclear ribosomal and combined datasets, it was strongly supported in a clade with two other southern South Island endemic species, Ourisia confertifolia and O. glandulosa.

In another phylogenetic study using amplified fragment length polymorphisms (AFLPs), all three sampled individuals formed a highly supported clade that was in turn highly supported as being closely related to O. confertifolia and O. glandulosa. The three sampled individuals of O. confertifolia also comprised one of the significant clusters in the Bayesian clustering analysis.

== Conservation status ==
Ourisia spathulata is listed as At Risk - Naturally Uncommon, with the qualifier Range Restricted (RR) in the most recent assessment (2017–2018) of the New Zealand Threatened Classification for plants.

== Gallery ==
Fruits, leaves and flowers of O.&nbsp;spathulata

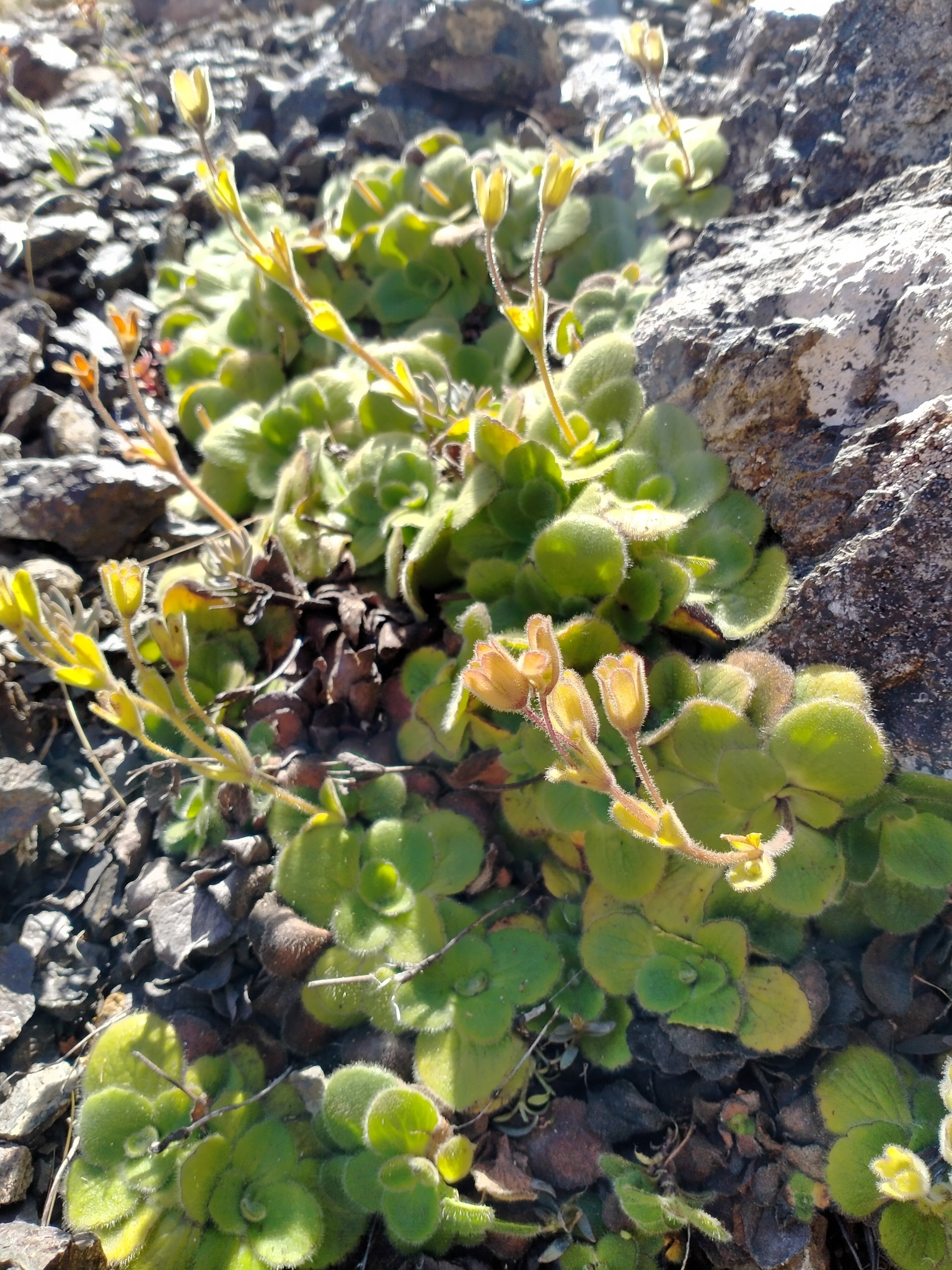

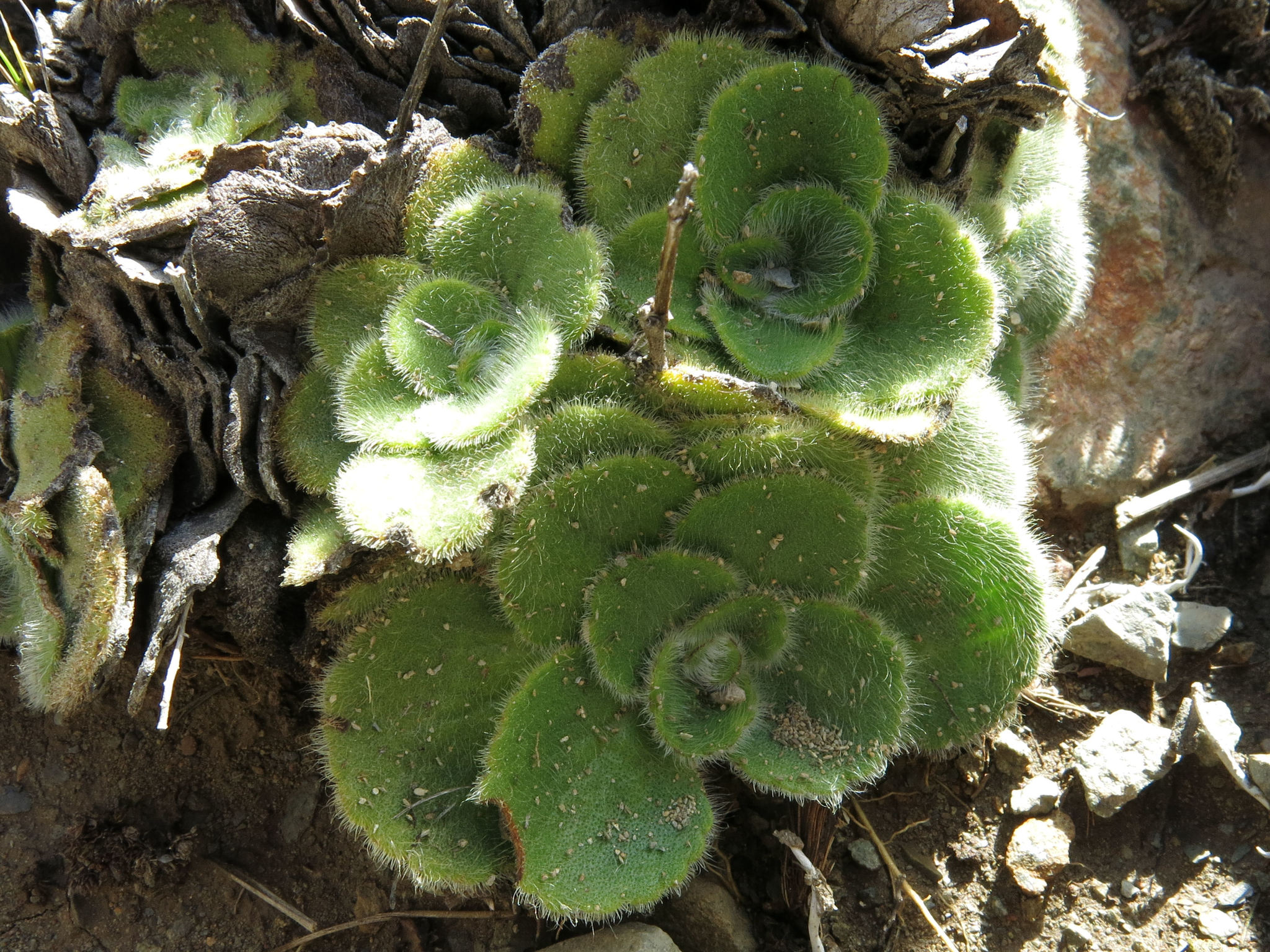

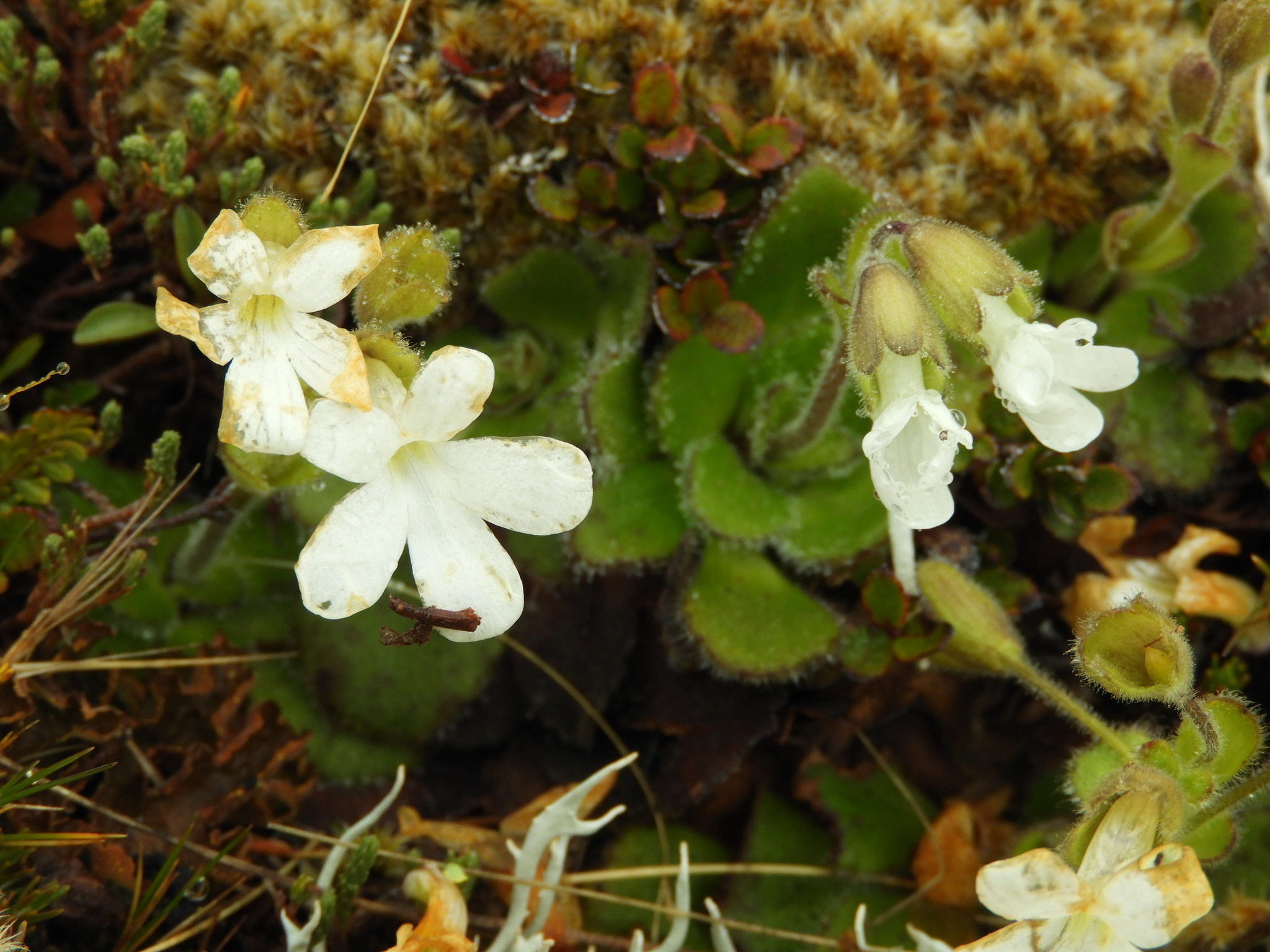
