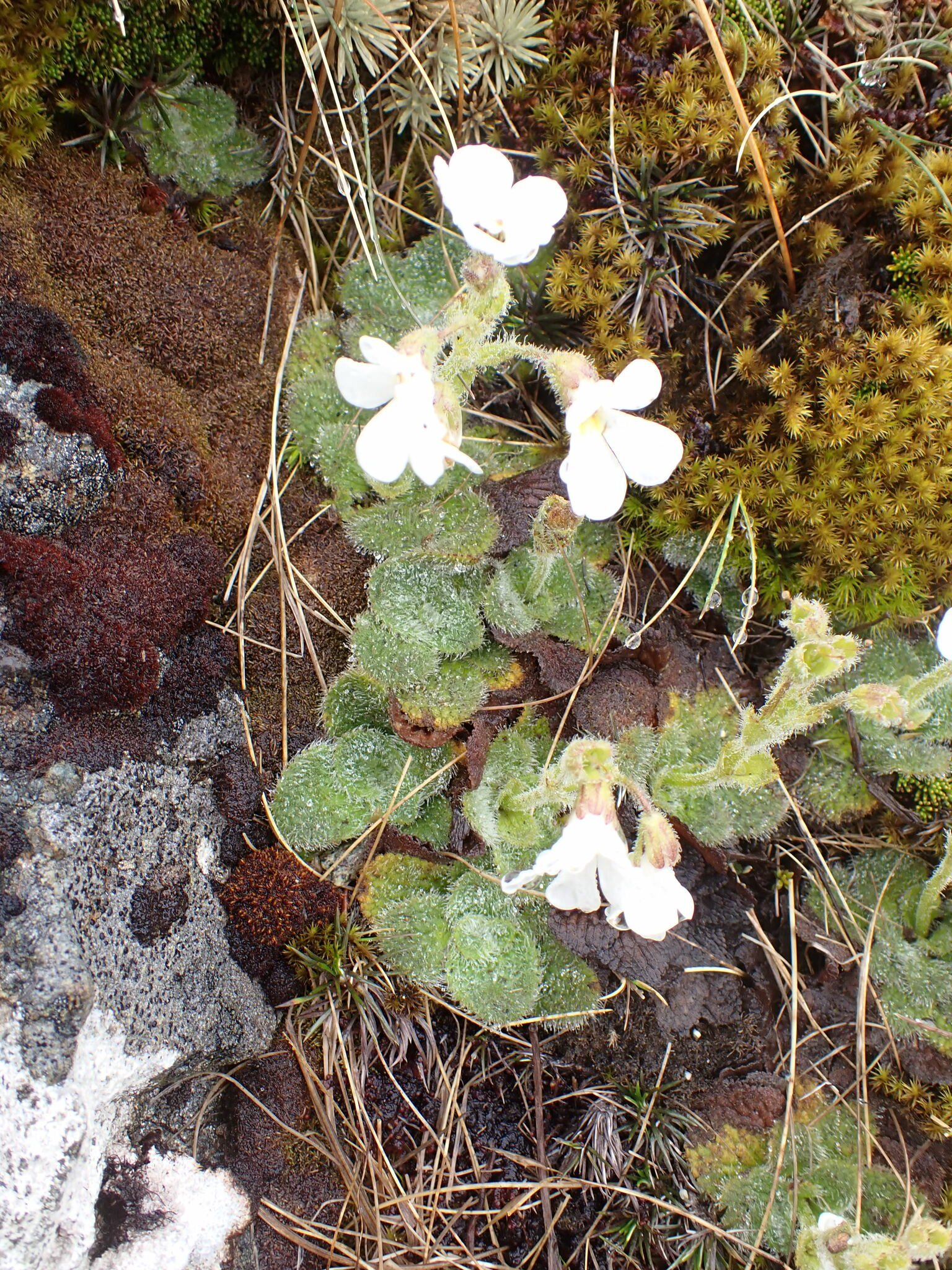
- Flowering O. confertifolia observed in Fiordland National Park, South Island, New Zealand

Conservation status
- Naturally Uncommon (NZ TCS)

Scientific classification
- Kingdom: Plantae
- Clade: Tracheophytes
- Clade: Angiosperms
- Clade: Eudicots
- Clade: Asterids
- Order: Lamiales
- Family: Plantaginaceae
- Genus: Ourisia
- Species: O. confertifolia

Binomial name
- Ourisia confertifolia Arroyo

= Ourisia confertifolia =

Species of flowering plant

Ourisia confertifolia is a species of flowering plant in the family Plantaginaceae that is endemic to high-elevations in the southern South Island of New Zealand. Mary Kalin Arroyo described O. confertifolia in 1984. Plants of this species of New Zealand mountain foxglove are perennial, small-leaved rosette herbs that have hairy, crenate leaves, and flowers single or in pairs in each node. The corolla tube is glabrous and yellow inside. It is listed as At Risk - Naturally Uncommon.

== Taxonomy ==
Ourisia confertifolia Arroyo is in the plant family Plantaginaceae. Mary Kalin Arroyo described O. confertifolia 1984.

The type material was collected by Mary Kalin Arroyo at Gertrude Saddle, Fiordland National Park, South Island, New Zealand. The holotype is housed at the Allan Herbarium of Manaaki Whenua – Landcare Research.

Ourisia confertifolia is morphologically similar to other New Zealand small-leaved species, namely O. sessilifolia, O. simpsonii, and O. spathulata, with which it shares irregular white corollas and having a mixture of glandular and non-glandular hairs on many plant parts.

O. confertifolia can be distinguished from O. sessilifolia by its corolla tube that is yellow and glabrous (hairless) inside (vs. purple and with 1 or 3 lines of hairs), flowers and bracts in pairs only (vs. sometimes in whorls), irregular calyces (vs. regular), and leaves that are glabrous on the underside (vs. hairy).

O. confertifolia can be distinguished from O. simpsonii by a number of characters including its smaller, narrower flowers (especially the style which is < 4.8 mm in O. confertifolia vs. > 4.9 mm in O. simpsonii) which are yellow inside the corolla tube (vs. yellow and sometimes purple in O. simpsonii). The glandular hairs on the pedicels of O. confertifolia are the same length as the non-glandular hairs (whereas they are much smaller in O. simpsonii). The two species have non-overlapping geographic distributions, with O. simpsonii in the northern South Island only.

O. confertifolia can be distinguished from O. spathulata by its rosette habit (vs. leaves found along the stem), leaves with a silky appearance on the upper side (vs. densely glandular-hairy with a velvety appearance on the upper side, and usually shorter inflorescences (< 9 cm long vs. > 10 cm long).

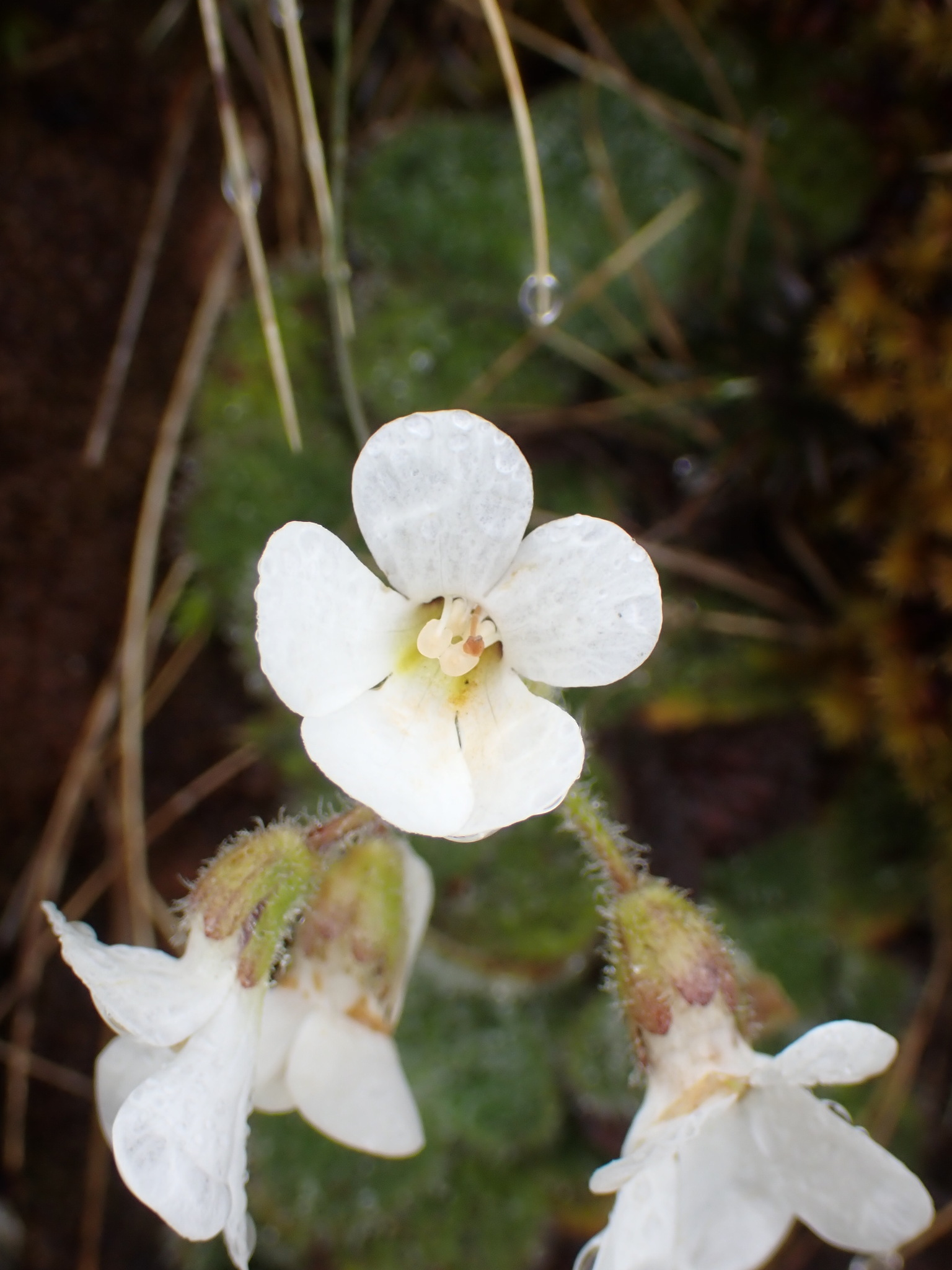
Flowers with no hairs (glabrous) inside the corolla tube

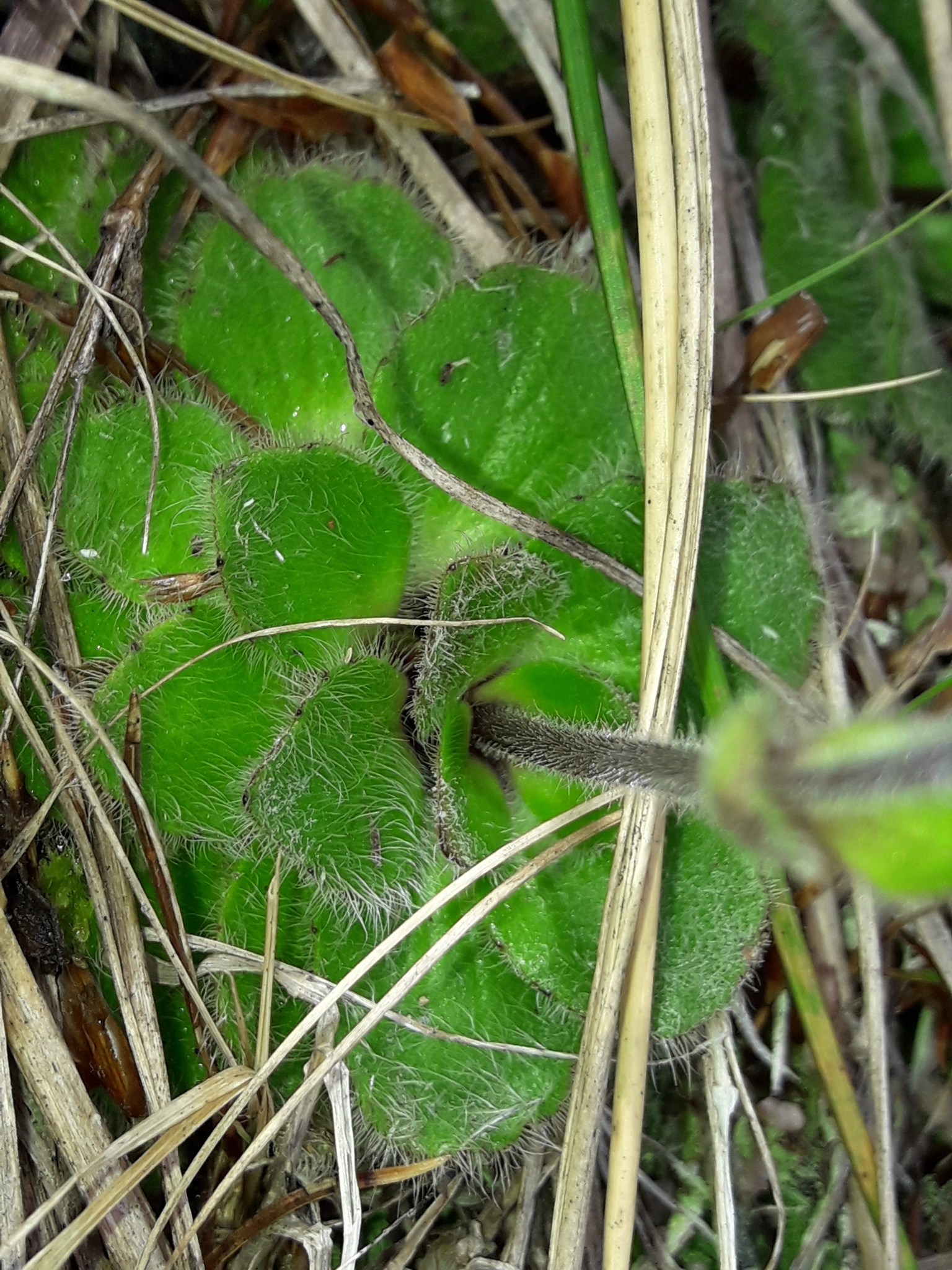
Rosette of hairy leaves

== Description ==
Ourisia confertifolia plants are perennial herbs. The stems are creeping, with leaves usually tightly packed into rosettes or subrosettes. Leaf petioles are 3.5–15.0 mm long. Leaf blades are 4.8–15.3 mm long by 5.5–16.3 mm wide (length: width ratio 0.7–1.3: 1), spathulate, broadly obovate or very broadly obovate, widest above the middle, with a rounded apex, cuneate base and obscurely and regularly crenate (or sometimes notched) edges. Leaves are densely hairy and silky with a mixture of long glandular and non-glandular hairs on the upper surface but mostly glabrous, densely punctate and with prominent veins on the lower surface. Inflorescences are erect, densely hairy racemes up to 105 mm long, with a mixture of glandular and non-glandular hairs, and with 1–3 flowering nodes and up to 6 total flowers per raceme. Each flowering node has 1–2 flowers and 2 sessile, clasping bracts that are oblanceolate to broadly obovate. The lowest bracts are similar to the leaves, 7.7–12.6 mm long and 3.8–7.6 mm wide, and become smaller toward the apex of the raceme. The flowers are borne on a densely hairy pedicel that is up to 21 mm long and has a mixture of glandular and non-glandular hairs. The calyx is 5.5–8.8 mm long, irregular, with 3 lobes divided to about one-quarter the length of the calyx and 2 divided to near the base, and densely hairy with a mixture of glandular and non-glandular hairs. The corolla is 14.5–19.4 mm long (including the 4.8–11.0 mm long corolla tube), bilabiate, tubular-funnelform, glabrous and white on the outside, and glabrous and yellow on the inside. The corolla lobes are 6.8–9.6 mm long, spreading, and obovate. There are 4 stamens up to 7.6 mm long which are didynamous, with two long stamens included inside the corolla or exserted, and 2 short stamens included inside the corolla or reaching the tube opening; a short staminode c. 0.2 mm long is also sometimes present. The style is 3.2–4.8 mm long, included inside the corolla tube or exserted, with an emarginate stigma. The ovary is 2.6–4.6 mm long and glabrous. Fruits are capsules 4.5–7.1 mm long and 3.3–4.8 mm wide with loculicidal dehiscence and pedicels up to 21.6 mm long. There are about 240 tiny seeds in each capsule, 0.7–1.0 mm long and 0.4–0.5 mm wide, with a two-layered, reticulate seed coat.

Ourisia confertifolia flowers from November to February and fruits from January to May.

The chromosome number of Ourisia confertifolia is 2n=48.

== Distribution and habitat ==
Ourisia confertifolia is a New Zealand mountain foxglove that is endemic to the South Island of New Zealand. It is found in the regions of southern Westland, Fiordland and Southland in high-elevation habitats in herbfields, grasslands or rocky, sheltered habitats from 1,200 to 2,200 m (3,900 to 7,200 ft) above sea level.

== Phylogeny ==
An individual of O. confertifolia was included in phylogenetic analyses of all species of the genus Ourisia using standard DNA sequencing markers (two nuclear ribosomal DNA markers and two chloroplast DNA regions) and morphological data. In all analyses, the sampled individual belonged to the highly supported New Zealand lineage, and in the nuclear ribosomal and combined datasets, it was strongly supported in a clade with two other southern South Island endemic species, Ourisia spathulata and O. glandulosa.

In another phylogenetic study using amplified fragment length polymorphisms (AFLPs), all four sampled individuals formed a highly supported clade that was in turn highly supported as being closely related to O. spathluata and O. glandulosa. The four sampled individuals of O. confertifolia also comprised one of the significant clusters in the Bayesian clustering analysis.

== Conservation status ==
Ourisia confertifolia is listed as At Risk - Naturally Uncommon in the most recent assessment (2017–2018) of the New Zealand Threatened Classification for plants.

== Gallery ==
Flowers and fruiting plants of O.&nbsp;confertifolia

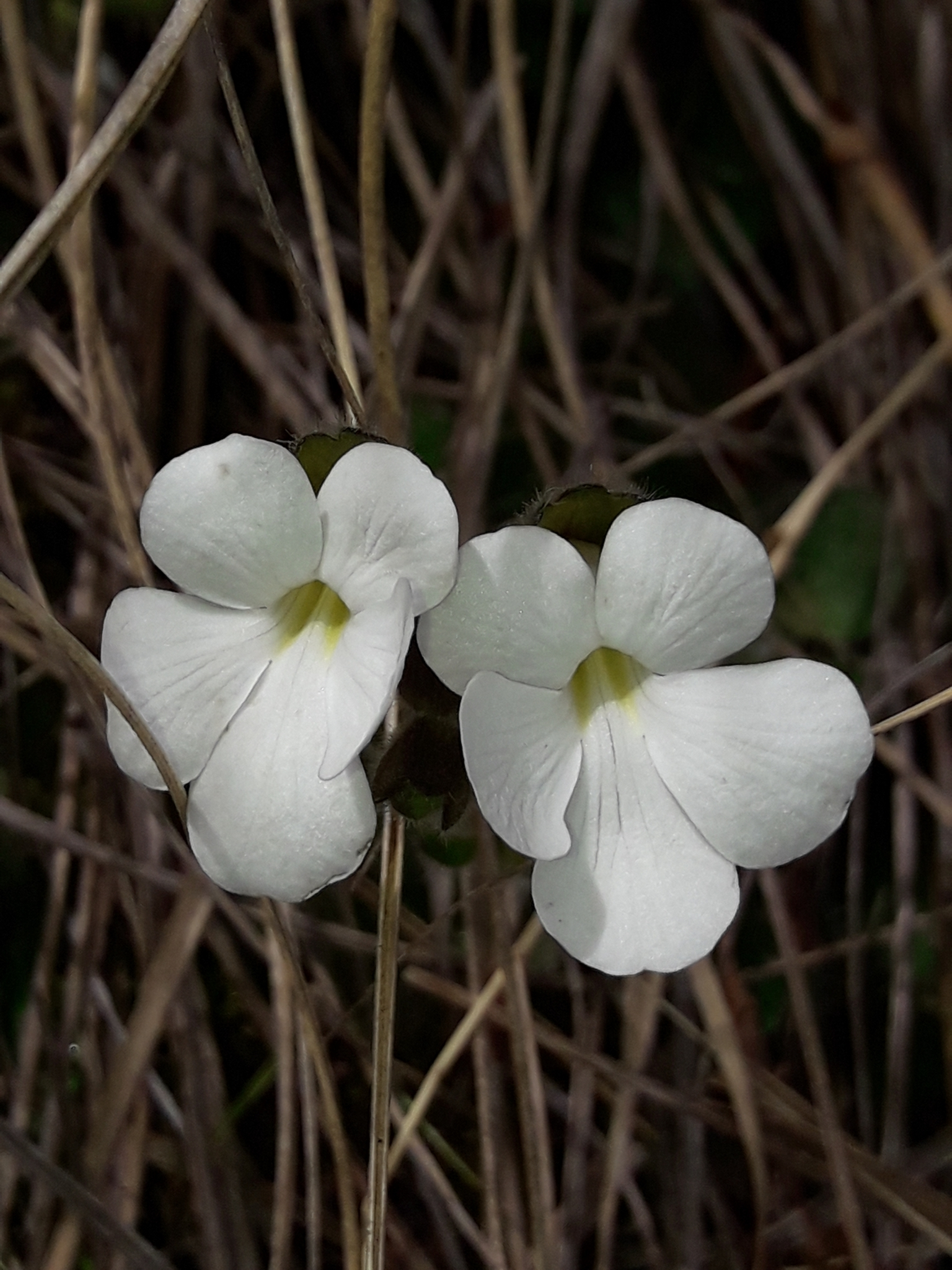

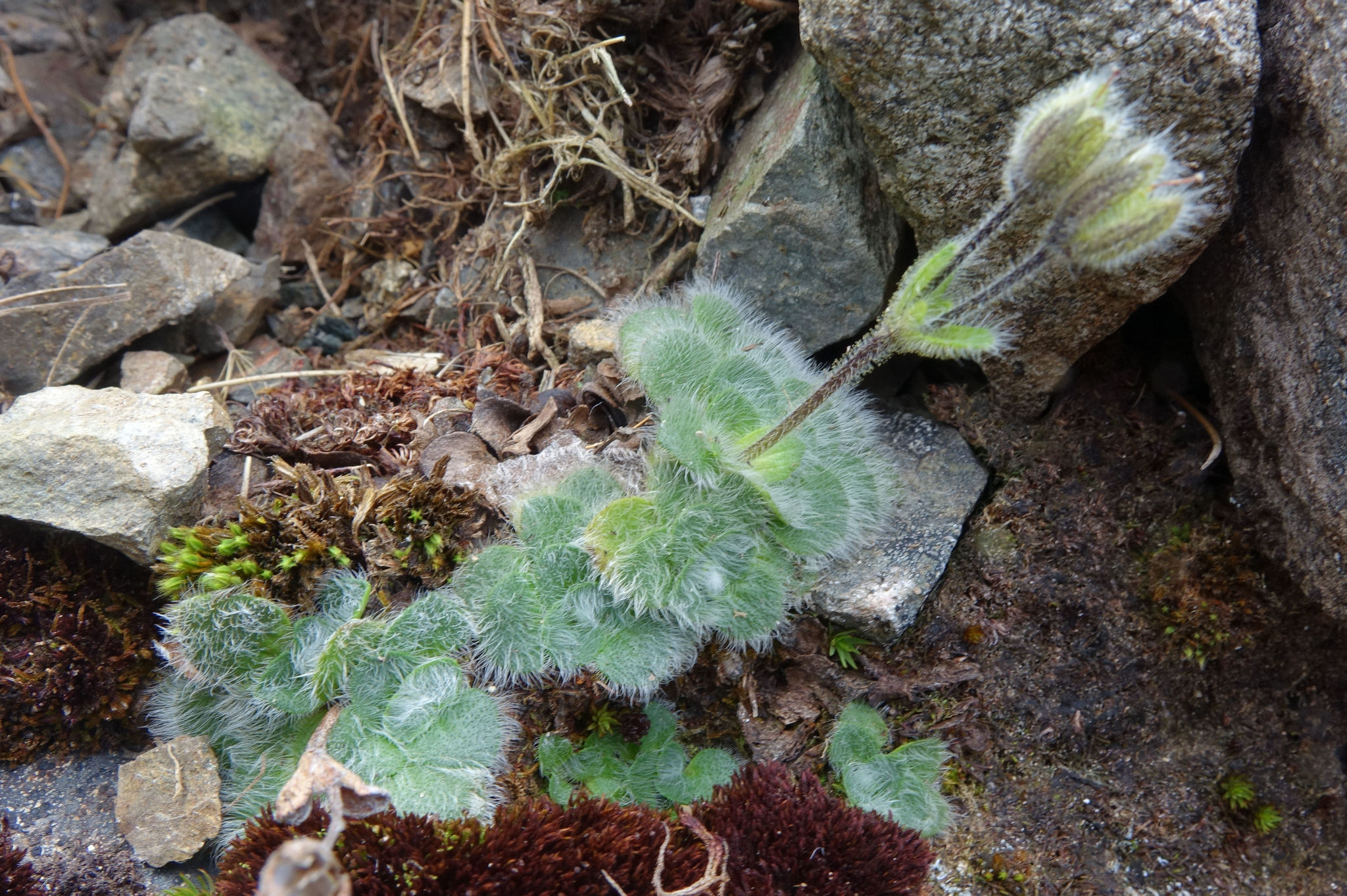

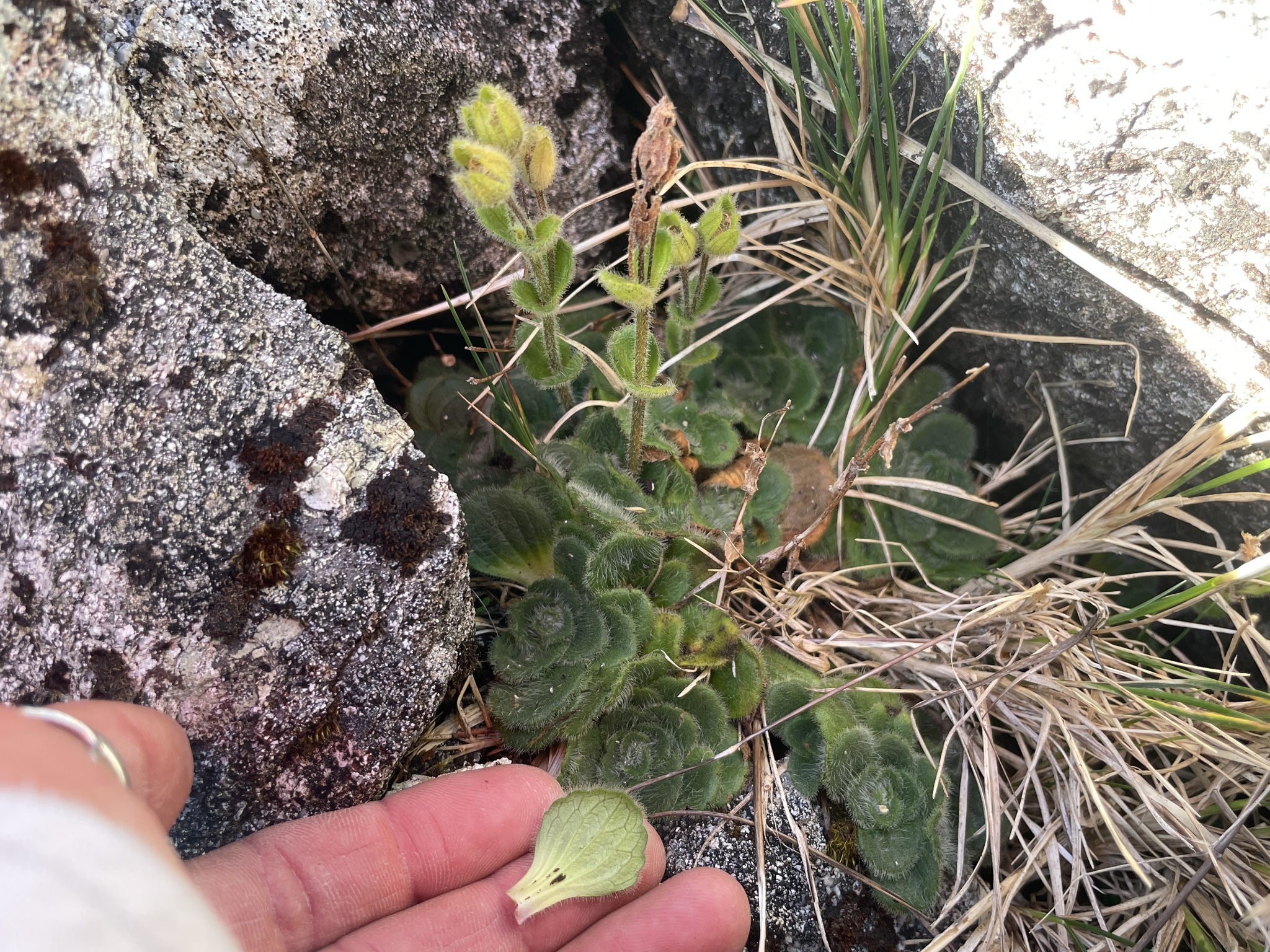
