= AIRES Flight 585 =

1985 aircraft accident in South America

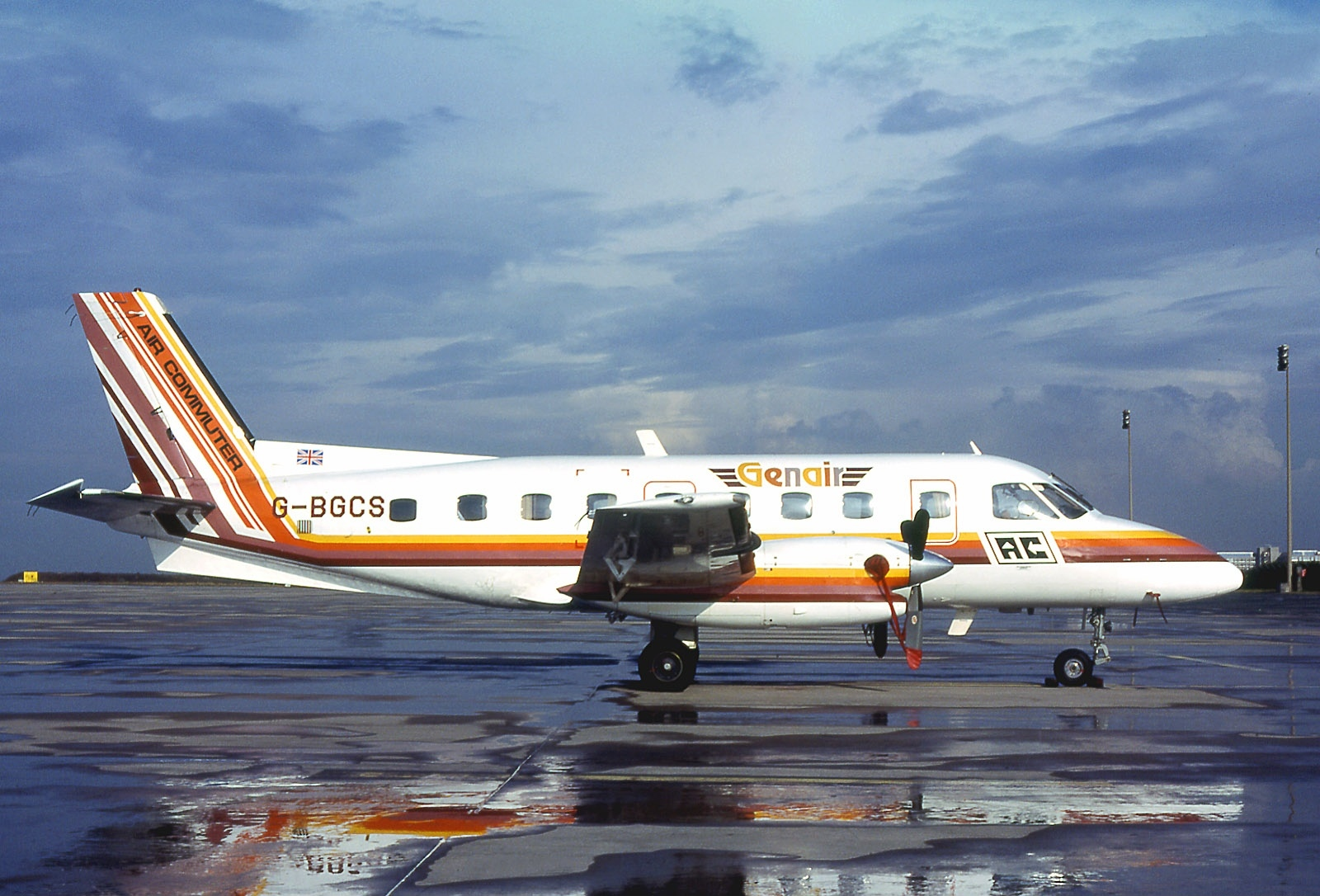
- An Embraer EMB-110 Bandeirante similar to the aircraft involved in the accident.

Accident
- Date: 23 January 1985
- Summary: Controlled flight into terrain due to pilot error
- Site: Cerro Tesorito, near Manizales, Colombia; 5.046787°N 75.424567°W

Aircraft
- Aircraft type: Embraer EMB-110P1 Bandeirante
- Operator: AIRES
- Registration: HK-2638
- Flight origin: Gustavo Artunduaga Paredes Airport, Florencia, Colombia
- Stopover: Benito Salas Airport, Neiva, Colombia
- Destination: Alfonso Bonilla Aragón International Airport, Cali, Colombia
- Occupants: 17
- Passengers: 15
- Crew: 2
- Fatalities: 17
- Survivors: 0

AIRES Flight 585 was a regularly scheduled passenger flight from Florencia, Colombia to Cali, Colombia with an intermediate stopover in Neiva, Colombia. On 23 January 1985, the Embraer EMB 110 Bandeirante operating the flight crashed into a mountainside at an altitude of 8,600 feet while on approach to Cali, Colombia, killing all 17 occupants onboard. The crash of flight 585 occurred concurrently with the crash of Aerolineas Centrales de Colombia (ACES) Flight 52, a de Havilland Canada DHC-6 Twin Otter 300 which impacted the side of the Cerro el Plateado mountains at 11,500 feet near the Alto Concordia summit, killing all 23 occupants onboard, of which two were children. The two aircraft crashed only minutes apart.

== Aircraft and crew ==
The aircraft was an AIRES Colombia Embraer EMB-110P1 Bandeirante, registration HK-2638 (serial no. 110-341), manufactured in 1981. It was equipped with twin Pratt & Whitney Canada PT6A-34 engines. The crew consisted of a captain and a first officer. Captain Sergio Velasquez Granados (aged 30) had accumulated a total of 4,568 flight hours, of which 1,576 were on the Embraer Bandeirante. First officer German Pastrana Borrero (aged 28) had accumulated a total of 3,586 flight hours, of which 2,421 were on the Embraer Bandeirante. There were also 15 passengers onboard. Among the passengers were students from the Universidad Santo Tomás in Bogota, Colombia (USTA, University of Santo Tomás). Some were returning from Cali after celebrating Christmas with their families.

== Accident ==
The flight from Florencia to Neiva was uneventful. The flight took off from Neiva at 09:41 local time for the second leg to Cali. It cruised at an altitude of 14,500 feet. Weather was poor with low visibility, mist and intermittent showers on the flight path. On approach to Cali, the crew radioed the tower in Barranquilla that they were about to land and had passed the Tulua waypoint and descended to 13,000 feet. The crew then stated to the tower that they were descending from 13,000 feet. This was the last transmission received from the aircraft. Moments later, at an altitude of 8,000 feet, the crew stated, "We are in an emergency", informing the tower that there was a problem with one of the engines. A transcript of the CVR recording and conversations to the tower is below (translated from the original Spanish):

585 – Cali Control, two six three eight (initial contact)

CTL – Two six three eight (callsign), go ahead

585 – Good morning, two six three eight, Neiva is our station, we are approaching Tuluá

CTL – Approaching Tuluá, visual flight plan correct?

585 – Correct

CTL – What is your altitude?

585 – We are descending from thirteen thousand feet

CTL – Maintain altitude, notify when passing Guacarí. A Cessna 152 left Tuluá one minute ago; starting visual descent at eight hundred feet towards Palmaseca. Visibility is progressively improving to the North, approximately twenty kilometers. El Cerrito is now in sight. The ceiling is approximately fifteen thousand feet to the north.

585 – Received. Please confirm the QNH for me

CTL – Three zero eight

(Another aircraft interrupts mid-conversation):

AVA – Cali Control, Avianca seven two seven, good morning, proceeding as filed, climbing to four thousand feet

CTL – Avianca seven two seven received, report Tuluá, report passing flight level zero nine zero

AVA – Okay, proceeding as filed. We will call at zero nine zero

CTL – Correct. For your information, an Aires Embraer left Tuluá two minutes ago descending visual towards Palmaseca; starting descent from one three zero towards Palmaseca visual

AVA – Okay, understood. What is the altitude?

CTL – He just descended from thirteen thousand feet on a visual course towards Palmaseca.

(About five seconds of silence pass and "I DOUBT IT" is heard. It could not be determined who said it. A minute and a half after this last transmission, Avianca HK-727 calls "blind" and asks:)

AVA – What altitude is the Bandeirante at?

CTL – Two six three eight, Control, what is your level?

585 – Two six three eight is to the east of ECHO, passing ten thousand feet

(The transmission is interrupted due to interfering transmission and only "...towards Palmira" is heard. Possibly referring to flight 2638)

CTL – Understood, Avianca seven two seven (HK-727). What is your altitude?

AVA – Seven two seven, we are passing flight level zero seven zero and twenty-two miles (DME distance from Cali VOR)

Moments later, flight 585 crashed into Cerro Tesorito, a mountain near the town of La Magdalena at an altitude of 8,600 feet, killing all 17 passengers and crew onboard.

== Investigation ==
The Departamento Administrativo de Aeronautica Civil of Colombia opened an investigation into the accident. It was found that the crew did not follow a visual flight rules path to the runway due to the poor visibility which obscured the view of the ground and instead were required to switch from VFR to instrument landing conditions (IMC) upon reaching the bad weather conditions; however, this was not done. In addition, the crew did not follow the flight path given by the ground personnel and flew outside of the flight path, which increased the risk of veering off course and hitting terrain that they could not see due to the mist. In addition, the airline was also criticized for allowing flights to fly outside of their assigned flight corridor without informing ATC.

Several recommendations were made as a result of the accident:

- flight operators must ensure that crews follow their assigned flight path at all times and are prohibited from deviating from their scheduled paths as well as implement stricter regulations for visual flights to ensure that crews do not deviate from their assigned flight paths
