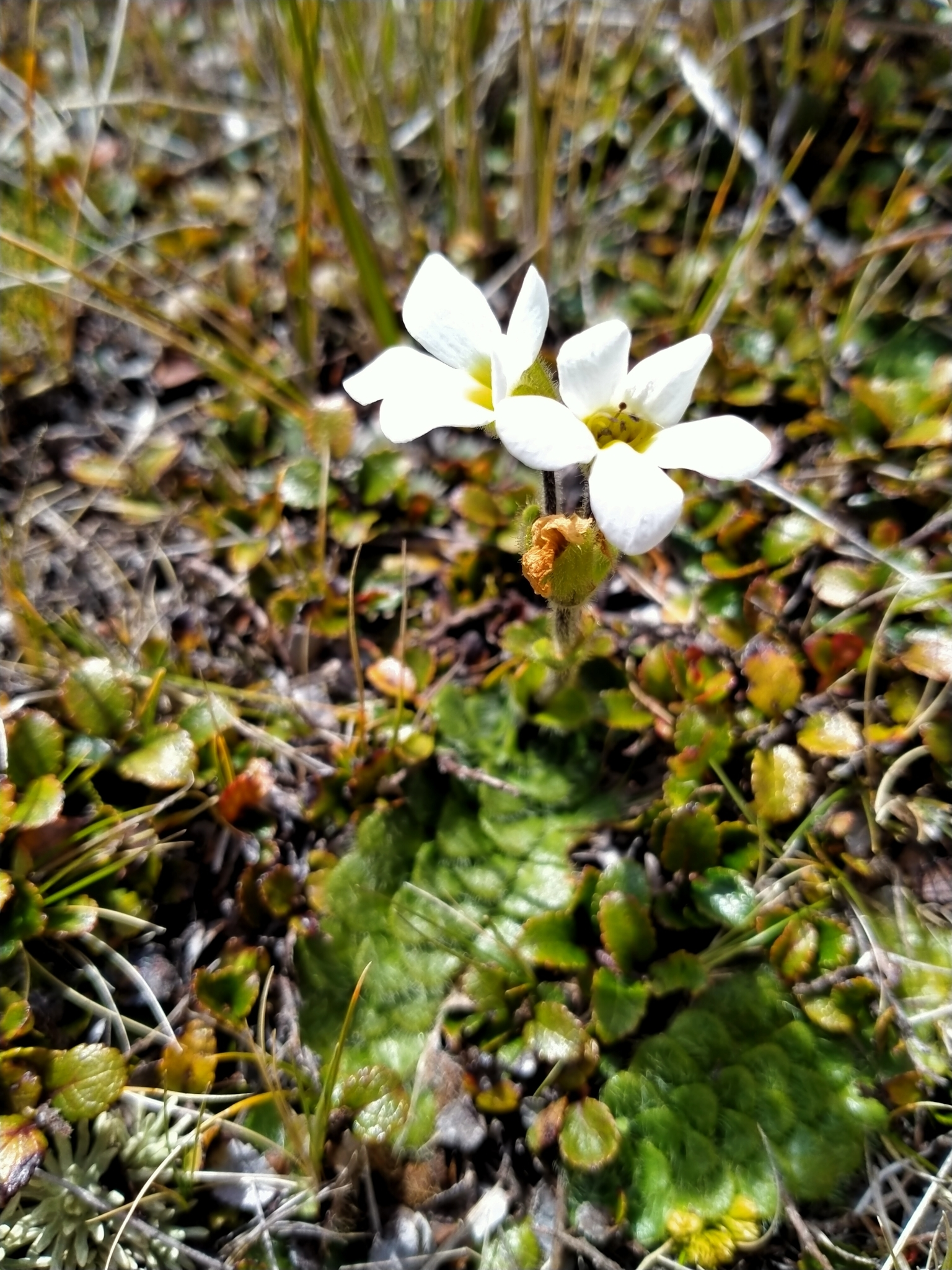
- Flowering O. glandulosa observed in Otago, South Island, New Zealand

Conservation status
- Not Threatened (NZ TCS)

Scientific classification
- Kingdom: Plantae
- Clade: Embryophytes
- Clade: Tracheophytes
- Clade: Spermatophytes
- Clade: Angiosperms
- Clade: Eudicots
- Clade: Asterids
- Order: Lamiales
- Family: Plantaginaceae
- Genus: Ourisia
- Species: O. glandulosa

Binomial name
- Ourisia glandulosa Hook.f.

= Ourisia glandulosa =

Species of flowering plant

Ourisia glandulosa or is a species of flowering plant in the family Plantaginaceae that is endemic to high-elevations in the southern South Island of New Zealand. Joseph Dalton Hooker described O. glandulosa in 1864. Plants of this species of New Zealand mountain foxglove are perennial, small-leaved herbs that have tightly packed, opposite, smooth or irregularly notched leaves, and flowers single or in pairs in each node. The corolla tube is glabrous and yellow inside. It is listed as Not Threatened.

== Taxonomy ==
Ourisia glandulosa is in the plant family Plantaginaceae. Joseph Dalton Hooker described O. glandulosa in Volume I of his Handbook of the New Zealand Flora in 1864.

The type material was collected by James Hector and John Buchanan in alpine areas of Otago, South Island, New Zealand. The holotype is housed at the herbarium of the Royal Botanical Gardens, Kew.

Ourisia glandulosa is morphologically most similar to another New Zealand small-leaved species, O. caespitosa, as both species are prostrate plants with tightly packed, often irregularly notched leaves and with flowers single or in pairs at each node (not whorled). O. glandulosa can be distinguished from O. caespitosa by its leaves that are sparsely to densely hairy near the apex on the upper side (vs. glabrous or hairless leaves), the corolla tube that is glabrous inside (vs. having three lines of yellow hairs inside), and numerous, short, glandular hairs found on most parts of the plant (often mixed with non-glandular hairs) (vs. glabrous plant parts).

Ourisia glandulosa can be distinguished from other small-leaved New Zealand species O. confertifolia, O. spathulata and O. simpsonii in its leaves that have fewer, non-glandular hairs only, and leaves that lack prominent major veins on the underside.

== Description ==
Ourisia glandulosa plants are perennial herbs. The stems are creeping, and densely packed with prostrate, opposite and often distichous leaves. Leaf petioles are 1.8–5.0 mm long. Leaf blades are 4.7–10.6 mm long by 3.0–8.4 mm wide (length: width ratio 1.2–1.5: 1), usually narrowly to broadly obovate or spathulate, widest above the middle, with a rounded apex, attenuate base and smooth edge (or sometimes with few irregular notches). Leaves are sparsely to densely hairy with non-glandular hairs near the tip on the upper surface but glabrous on the lower surface, and densely punctate on both surfaces. Inflorescences are erect, densely hairy racemes up to 143 mm long, with a mixture of glandular and non-glandular hairs, and with 1–4 flowering nodes and up to 7 total flowers per raceme. Each flowering node 1–2 flowers and 2 sessile, clasping bracts that are usually narrowly to very broadly obovate.

The lowest bracts are similar to the leaves, 6.0–9.1 mm long and 3.6–8.0 mm wide, and become smaller toward the apex of the raceme. The flowers are borne on a densely hairy pedicel that is up to 22 mm long and has a mixture of glandular and non-glandular hairs. The calyx is 6.2–8.6 mm long, irregular, with 3 lobes divided to about one-quarter the length of the calyx and 2 divided to near the base, and densely hairy with a mixture of glandular and non-glandular hairs. The corolla is 14.5–19.0 mm long (including the 6.1–9.8 mm long corolla tube), bilabiate, tubular-funnelform, glabrous and white on the outside (sometimes with purple near the base), and glabrous and yellow on the inside.

The corolla lobes are 5.0–10.3 mm long, spreading, and obovate to obcordate. There are 4 stamens up to 10.0 mm long which are didynamous, with two long stamens reaching the tube opening, and 2 short stamens included inside the corolla; a short staminode up to 1.7 mm long is also present. The style is 4.0–6.0 mm long, not exserted, with an emarginate stigma. The ovary is 2.9–4.8 mm long and glabrous. Fruits are capsules 5.5–6.0 mm long and 4.3–4.6 mm wide with loculicidal dehiscence and pedicels up to 21.7 mm long. The number of tiny seeds in each capsule is unknown, but they are 0.6–1.0 mm long and 0.4–0.6 mm wide, rectangular, linear oblong or narrowly oblong with a single-layered reticulate seed coat.

Ourisia glandulosa flowers from December to March and fruits from January to April.

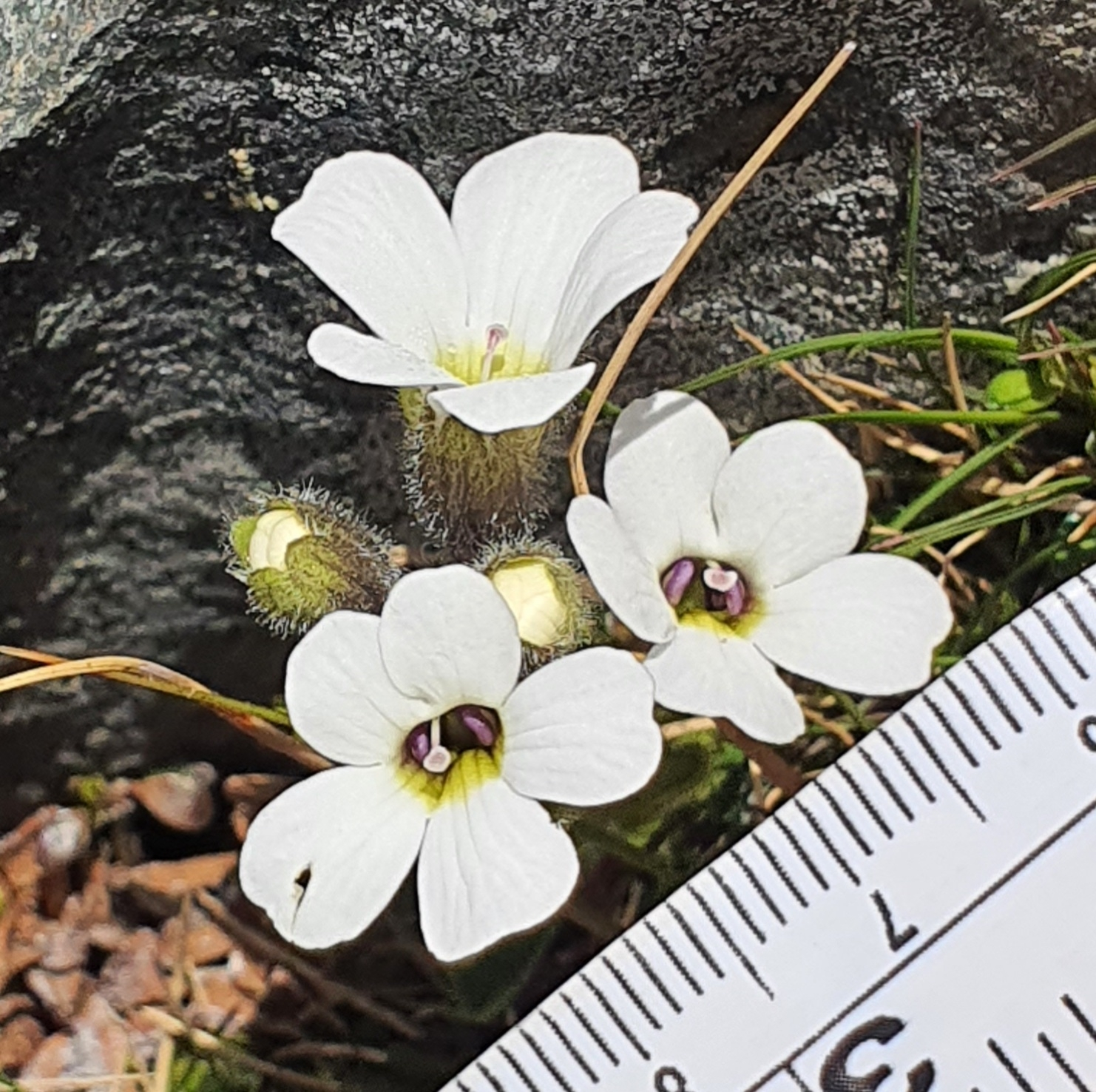
Flowers with no hairs (glabrous) inside the corolla tube

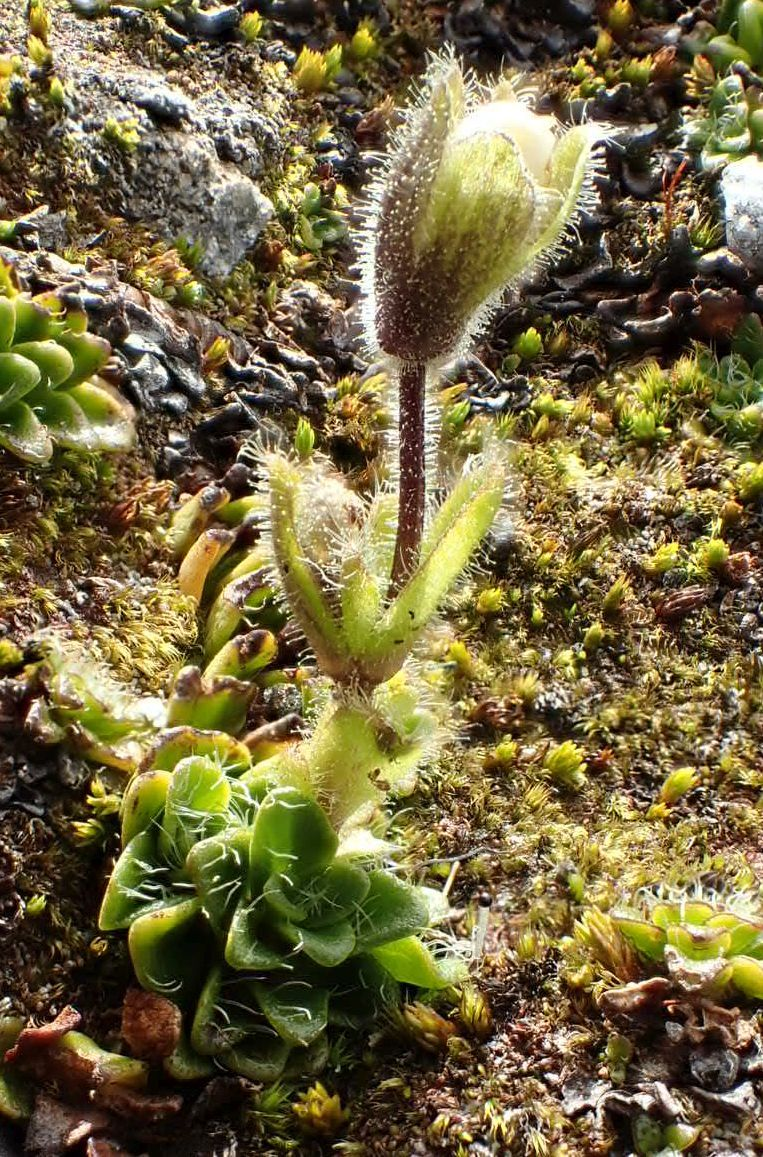
Individual of O. glandulosa about to flower, with densely hairy calyx, pedicel and bracts with glandular and non-glandular hairs

The chromosome number of Ourisia glandulosa is 2n=48.

== Distribution and habitat ==
Ourisia glandulosa is a New Zealand mountain foxglove that is endemic to the South Island of New Zealand. It is widespread and common in most high-elevation areas of Otago, especially around snowbanks, and can also be found in some high-elevation areas of nearby southern Canterbury and Southland.

It grows in damp, rocky, sheltered areas of herbfields, grasslands and scrub above the bush line from 1,050 to 2,000 m (3,440 to 6,560 ft) above sea level.

== Phylogeny ==
An individual of O. glandulosa was included in phylogenetic analyses of all species of the genus Ourisia using standard DNA sequencing markers (two nuclear ribosomal DNA markers and two chloroplast DNA regions) and morphological data. In all analyses, the sampled individual belonged to the highly supported New Zealand lineage, and in the nuclear ribosomal and combined datasets, it was strongly supported in a clade with two other southern South Island endemic species, Ourisia spathulata and O. confertifolia.

In another phylogenetic study using amplified fragment length polymorphisms (AFLPs), all 10 sampled individuals formed a highly supported clade that was in turn highly supported as being closely related to O. spathluata and O. confertifolia. Together, sampled individuals of O. glandulosa and O. spathulata also comprised one of the significant clusters in the Bayesian clustering analysis.

== Biology ==
Ourisia glandulosa was one of several New Zealand alpine flowering plants used in field experiments to show that flower color influences insect visitation in alpine New Zealand.

In a field study of alpine plant pollinators in the Remarkables Range, South Island, Ourisia glandulosa was visited by solitary bees and syrphid flies. Of the two groups of pollinators, a solitary bee in the genus Hylaeus (H. matamoko) was a more effective pollinator than syrphid flies in the genus Allograpta, likely performing 90% of the pollination of O. glandulosa.

O. glandulosa is one of many alpine species from New Zealand with axillary buds (flower primordia) that form in autumn, but it is also only one of a handful of those species whose axillary buds are obviously enlarged.

== Conservation status ==
Ourisia glandulosa is listed as Not Threatened in the most recent assessment (2017–2018) of the New Zealand Threatened Classification for plants.

== Gallery ==
Leaves and habit of O. glandulosa

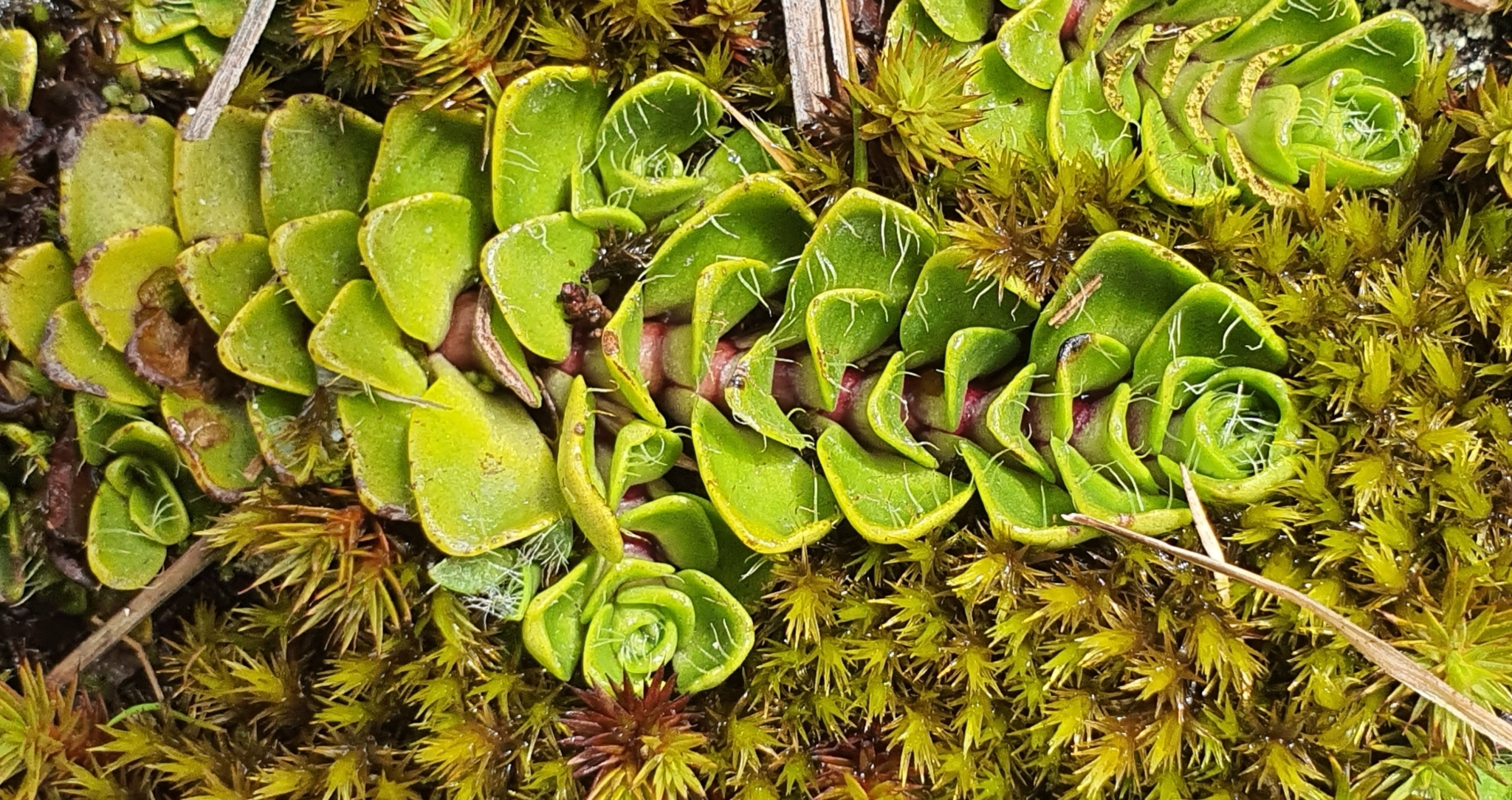

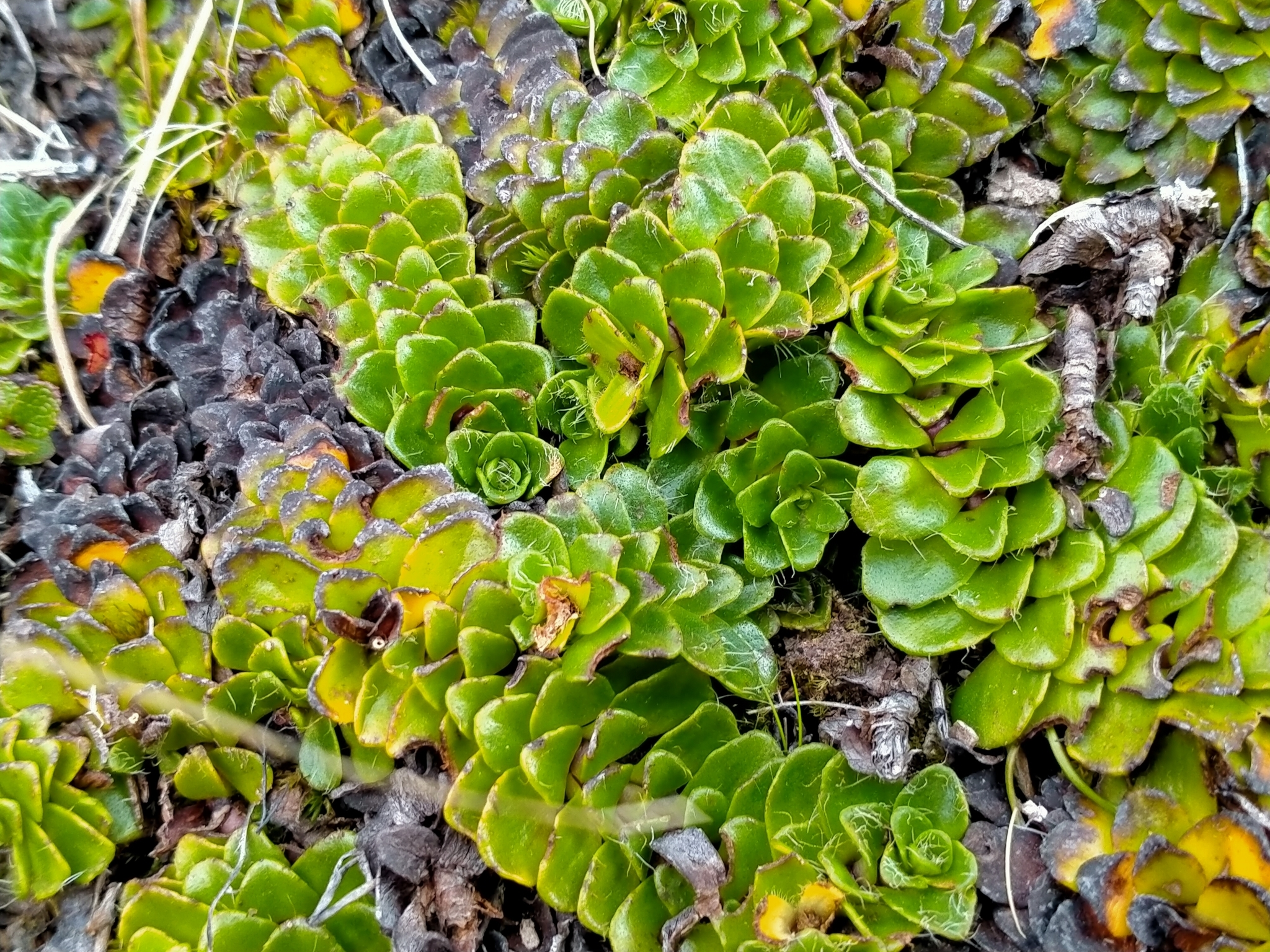

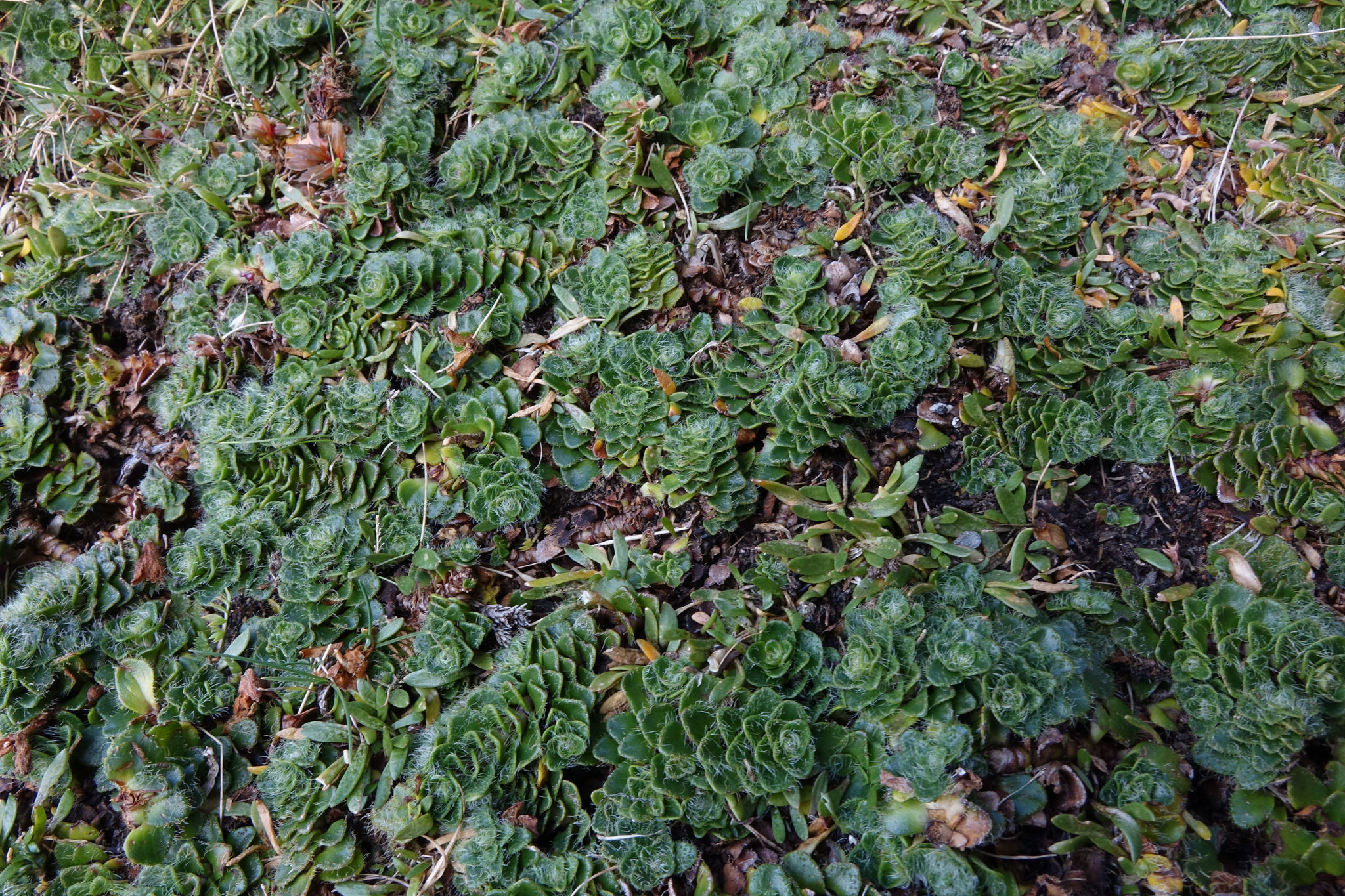
