= Florencia =

Florencia may refer to:

== Places ==
- Florencia de Benito Juárez, a municipality in the state of Zacatecas, Mexico
- Florencia, Caquetá, a town and municipality in the Department of Caqueta, Colombia
- Florencia, Cauca, a town and municipality in the Department of Cauca, Colombia
- Florencia, Cuba, a municipality and city in the Ciego de Ávila Province of Cuba

== Other ==
- Florencia (given name), the Spanish variant of Florence
- Spanish: Florencia, the Spanish name of the Italian city Florence
- Florencia Airport, Bolivia
- Florencia (street gang), a Chicago gang
- Florencia 13, a Mexican-American street gang allied with the Sureños
