= Fabris =

Fabris is a surname. Notable persons with that name include:

- Antun Fabris (1864–1904), Serbian journalist
- Emilio De Fabris (1808–1883), an Italian architect
- Enrico Fabris (born 1981), Italian speed skater
- Eurosia Fabris (1866–1932), Italian religious figure
- Florencia Fabris (1975–2013), Argentine opera soprano
- Gabriele Fabris (born 1988), Italian footballer
- Pietro Fabris (painter) (fl. 1740–1792), Italian painter and engraver
- Salvator Fabris (1544–1618), Italian fencing master
- Samuel Fabris (born 1991), Belgian footballer
- Umberto Fabris, Yugoslav politician

See also:
