= Florencia Zaccanti =

Argentine model, television personality and reality star

Florencia Zaccanti is an Argentine model, television personality and reality star.

== Biography ==
Zaccanti was born in Mar del Plata, Argentina. She is the daughter of former Racing Club de Avellaneda football player Cosme Zaccanti.

Zaccanti's name began to be heard in the media when it was related as the third in discord between actress Jimena Baron and football player Daniel Osvaldo.

This situation led her to enter "Gran Hermano 2015", thanks to the public vote in a playoff. Her participation in the house was 35 days when after a nomination she obtained 53.8% of the public's votes to be expelled.

In 2016, she participated in a vote to enter "Gran Hermano 2016" but it was not selected by the public.

In 2017 she served as secretary of the program Nosotros a la mañana.

After years away from the medium, she announced that she would be one of the participants of "Too Hot to Handle (TV series)" in its Latin version for Netflix. The season premiered on September 15, 2021.

=== Abstract ===
Reality shows
Year	Title	Role	Entered	Exited	Status
2015	Gran Hermano 2015	Competitor	Day 93	Day 127	11th eliminated
2021	Jugando con Fuego: Latino	Competitor	Episode 1	Episode 8	Unknown

Programs
Year	Title	Role	Notes
2017	Nosotros a la mañana	Secretary	
