= Mary Kalin Arroyo =

New Zealand botanist (born 1944)

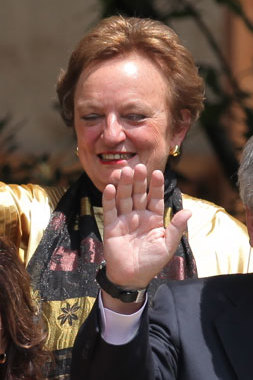
- Mary Therese Kalin in 2010
- Born: 1944 (age 81–82)
- Citizenship: New Zealand
- Education: University of Canterbury
- Awards: Tyler Prize§ (2004); Volvo Environment Prize (2005); National Prize for Natural Sciences (2010)
- Scientific career
- Fields: Botany
- Workplaces: University of Chile

Notes
- §As part of Red Latinoamericana de Botánica.

Mary Therese Kalin Arroyo (born in 1944, New Zealand) is a New Zealand botanist based in Chile. She is currently a professor of biology at the University of Chile. Kalin-Arroyo is notable for revising the indigenous genus Ourisia and discovering several new species in New Zealand. Her studies have also led to the designation of central Chile as a biodiversity hotspot.

== Early life and education ==
She earned her BSc honors degree at the University of Canterbury in Christchurch, New Zealand in graduating with first class honours in 1967. She then completed her Ph.D in Botany from UC Berkeley in 1971. The following year, Kalin-Arroyo did a post-doctoral with Peter Raven at the New York Botanical Garden.

In 1978, she married her husband Manuel Arroyo and together with their son, moved to the University of Chile where she would work as an associate professor. Dr. Kalin-Arroyo would later become a full professor in 1984. Currently, she is the director of the Institute for Ecology and Biodiversity at the University of Chile.

== Research ==
Kalin-Arroyo work looks at the reproductive biology of plants, primarily pollinators in high altitudes and the evolution of reproductive systems. Her second area of research is biogeography, where she is looking at the distribution of high altitude plants. She applied the combined her studies on the reproductive systems of plants with research on complete communities towards conservation. Furthermore, Dr. Kalin-Arroyo has also conducted conservation work where she evaluated the success of conservation in 16 Chilean protected areas. This has led to central Chile being declared a biodiversity hotspot,.

Another achievement of hers was to obtain an agreement to protect up to 68,000 acres in perpetuity (25%) of the River Condor drainage basin in Chile

== Awards ==
Kalin has received a large number of national and international honors. In 1984 she won the prestigious John Simon Guggenheim Fellowship. In 1998 she was elected "Fellow of the Linnean Society of London" in 1995 and "Corresponding Member of the Botanical Society of America." In 1996 she received the Award of Merit Labarca "in recognition of his outstanding academic achievements in the field of their profession, in the domain of culture and service to country." In 1997-1999 she was awarded a "Presidential Chair in Science" by the President of Chile. In 1998 she was elected "Honorary Fellow of the Royal Society of New Zealand" for her native country. In 1999, along with Ramon Latorre, was chosen "Foreign Member of the US Academy of Science", constituting one of the first two scientists in the country who have received this high honor. In 2003 she joined the Chilean Academy of Sciences as a Corresponding Member. In 2010 she won Chile's National Prize for Natural Sciences.

== Bibliography ==
- Cowling, Richard M.; Rundel, Philip W.; Lamont, Bryon B.; Kalin Arroyo, Mary T.; Arianoutsou, Margarita (1996). "Plant diversity in Mediterranean-climate regions". Trends in Ecology & Evolution. 11 (9): 362–366. Bibcode:1996TEcoE..11..362C. doi:10.1016/0169-5347(96)10044-6. PMID 21237880.
- Kalin Arroyo, Mary T. (1981). "Breeding systems and pollination biology in Leguminosae". Advances in Legume Systematics: 723–769.
- Kalin Arroyo, Mary T.; Primack, Richard; Armesto, Juan (1982). "Community Studies in Pollination Ecology in the High Temperate Andes of Central Chile. I. Pollination Mechanisms and Altitudinal Variation". American Journal of Botany. 69 (1): 82–97. doi:10.1002/j.1537-2197.1982.tb13237.x. JSTOR 2442833.
- Kalin Arroyo, Mary T.; Uslar, Paulina (1993). "Breeding systems in a temperate Mediterranean-type climate montane sclerophyllous forest in central Chile". Botanical Journal of the Linnean Society. 111 (1): 83–102. doi:10.1111/j.1095-8339.1993.tb01892.x.

== Taxa ==
- Acosmium cardenasii H.S.Irwin & Arroyo
- Gentianella multicaulis (Gillies ex Griseb.)Fabris (syn.Gentianella gilliesii (Gilg) Martic. & Arroyo nom. illeg.)
- Nassauvia coronipappa Arroyo et Martic.
- Oriastrum achenohirsutum (Tombesi)A.M.R. Davies (syn. Chaetanthera acheno-hirsuta Arroyo et al.)
