= Eyre Mountains / Taka Ra Haka Conservation Park =

Forest park in New Zealand

Eyre Mountains/Taka Ra Haka Conservation Park
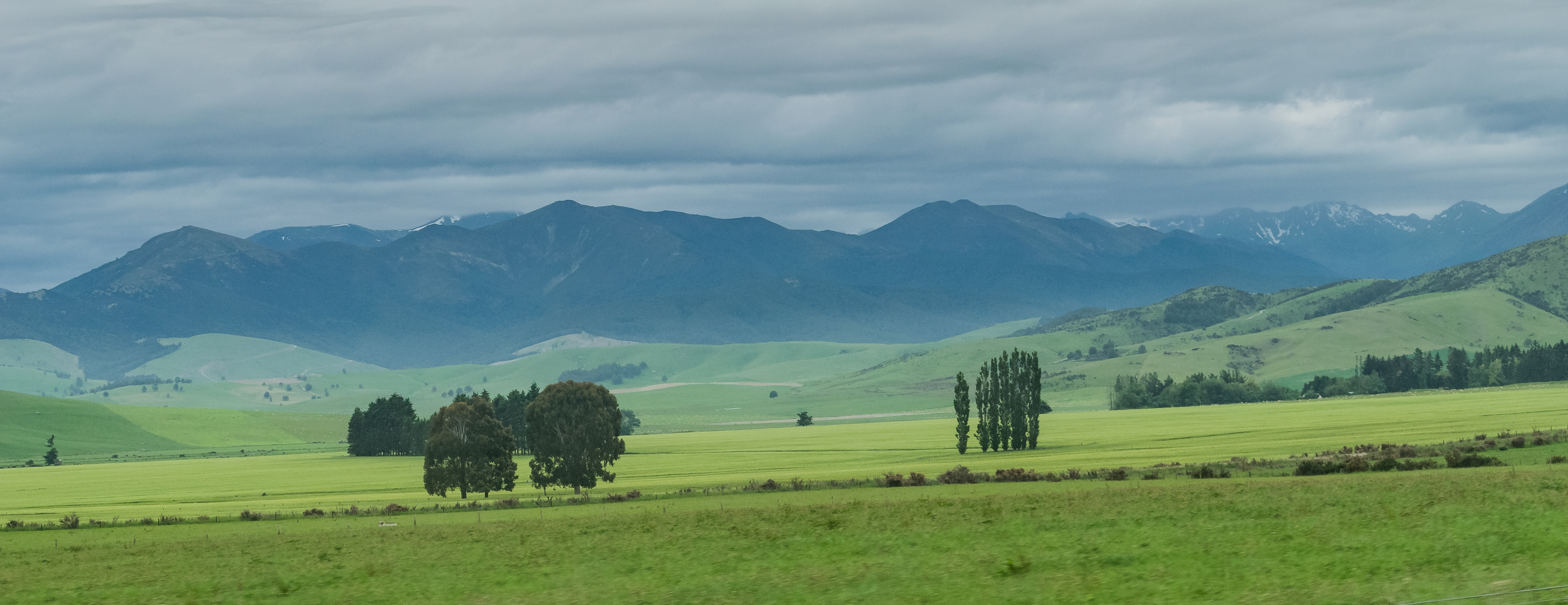
- Eyre Mountains/Taka Ra Haka Conservation Park

- Location within New Zealand
- Location: New Zealand
- Coordinates: 45.3459104°S 168.4557112°E
- Area: 65,160 hectares (161,000 acres)
- Established: 2005
- Governing body: Department of Conservation

Eyre Mountains/Taka Ra Haka Conservation Park is a protected area and mountain range in the Southland District and Southland Region of New Zealand's South Island.

== Geography ==
The park covers 65,160 hectares (161,000 acres).

== History ==
The park was established in 2005.
