= Florencia Raitzin-Legrand =

Argentine-born French pianist

Florencia Raitzin-Legrand is an Argentine-born French pianist who resides in Paris. She has performed with the French National Orchestra and the Amadeus Quartet, and was invited to participate in Sviatoslav Richter's festival at La Grange de Meslay.

== Autobiography ==
Florencia Raitzin-Legrand wrote an autobiography, 'The Tropic Bird', under the name of Serena Leigh Dalban.
