= Florencia Luna =

Argentine philosopher and bioethicist

Florencia Luna (born May 16, 1962) is an Argentine doctor of philosophy with specialization in bioethics.

== Education ==
Luna attended Columbia University for her Masters of Arts before receiving her PhD in philosophy from the University of Buenos Aires.

== Career ==
Luna works at CONICET as principal researcher and directs the bioethics program at FLACSO in Argentina. She is the principal investigator for the Training Program in Research Ethics in the Americas bioethics project at FLACSO. Luna is a professor and has taught internationally at universities such as the University of Barcelona (Spain), Princeton University, and Johns Hopkins School of Public Health.

In 1996, she founded and was editor of Argentine bioethics journal Perspectivas Bioéticas (“Bioethical Perspectives”). In 2016, she was designated the director of the World Health Organization (WHO) Collaborating Centre for Bioethics.

Her previous roles include president of the International Association of Bioethics (IAB) and member of the Steering Committee of the Global Forum on Bioethics in Research. Luna was an advisory member for the WHO in the Department of Tropical Diseases Research (TDR). She has been a member and contact for several international scientific organizations.

== Published works ==
Luna has articles published in both national and international journals and has co-authored several articles and books. She has written several books. Some of her works include:

- Bioethics and Vulnerability: A Latin American View (Rodopi, Amsterdam, 2006).
- Challenges for assisted reproduction and secondary infertility in Latin America (International Journal of Feminist Approaches to Bioethics, Vol. 7, No. 1, 2014)
- Ideal and Nonideal Theories: The Challenges of Decision-Making in an Imperfect World (Applying Nonideal Theory to Bioethics: Living and Dying in a Nonideal World. New York: Springer. 2021)
- Identifying and evaluating layers of vulnerability – a way forward (Developing World Bioethics, 2018)

== Awards ==
In 2006, Luna was awarded the Guggenheim Foundation Fellow and the Konex Prize for ethics in Argentina.
