= Florencia Fabris =

Argentine opera singer (1975–2013)

María Florencia Fabris (1975 – 1 September 2013) was an Argentine lyric soprano.

Fabris was born in Buenos Aires and initiated her choral career in the Teatro Colón's children choir, conducted by Valdo Sciammarella. Afterwards she was accepted at the Conservatorio di Santa Cecilia in Rome, Italy, where she studied opera under Mirella Freni and Renata Scotto. She had showcases in Brazil (Rio de Janeiro) and the United States.

In Argentina, she studied lyric singing at the Instituto Superior of the Colón Theatre with Reinaldo Censabella and Bruno D'Astoli, furthering her vocal technique with Horacio Amauri Pérez and her repertoire with Susana Cardonnet.

Among her most notable performances were her roles as Nedda in Pagliacci, Leonora in Il trovatore, the title roles in Madama Butterfly, Francesca da Rimini and Suor Angelica; Abigail in Nabucco, and Elisabetta in Don Carlos, among others.

She died, aged 38, two days after a performance of Giuseppe Verdi's Requiem at San Juan City, after being operated on for a stroke in the Hospital Español of Godoy Cruz, Mendoza.
