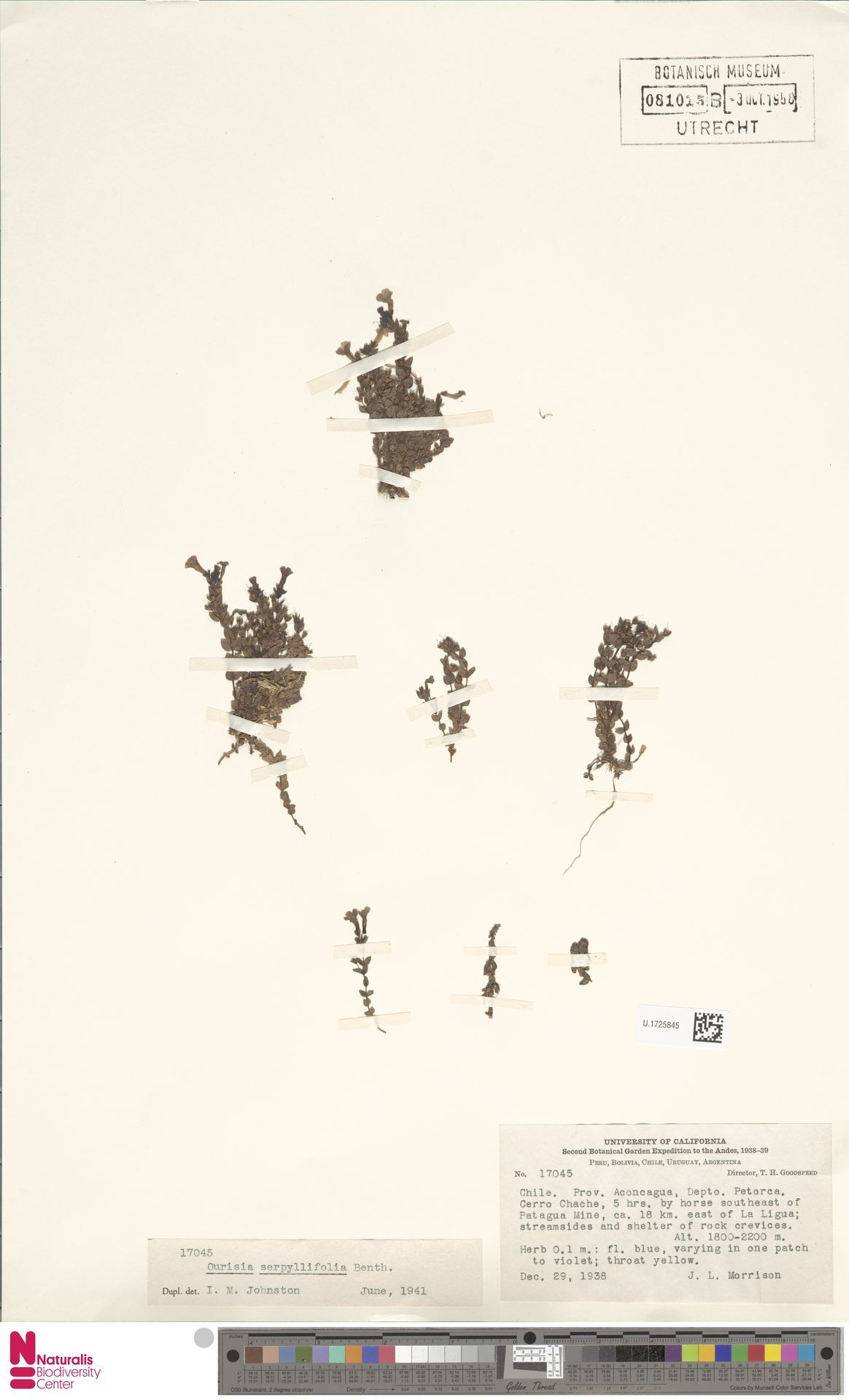
- Flowering herbarium specimen of Ourisia serpyllifolia

Scientific classification
- Kingdom: Plantae
- Clade: Tracheophytes
- Clade: Angiosperms
- Clade: Eudicots
- Clade: Asterids
- Order: Lamiales
- Family: Plantaginaceae
- Genus: Ourisia
- Species: O. serpyllifolia

Binomial name
- Ourisia serpyllifolia Benth.

Synonyms
- Ourisia melospermoides Phil.

= Ourisia serpyllifolia =

Species of flowering plant

Ourisia serpyllifolia is a species of flowering plant in the family Plantaginaceae that is endemic to the Andes mountains of central Chile. George Bentham described O. serpyllifolia in 1846. Plants of this species of South American foxglove are small, showy, perennial, many-branched and suffruticose with toothed, opposite leaves. The flowers are solitary, with a regular calyx, and a regular corolla. The calyx and corolla both have tiny glandular hairs. The corolla is violet, but the corolla tube is yellow and hairy inside.

== Taxonomy ==
Ourisia serpyllifolia Benth. is in the plant family Plantaginaceae. British botanist George Bentham described O. serpyllifolia in Augustin Pyramus de Candolle's 1846 publication, Prodromus.

The type material was collected by Claudio Gay in the Andes mountains in Chile in February 1843. The lectotype was designated by Heidi Meudt and is housed at Herbarium at the Geneva Botanical Garden (Herbarium G-DC). Ourisia melospermoides Phil. was described in 1872 by Rudolfo Amando Philippi and is a synonym of O. serpyllifolia. The lectotype of O. melospermoides was designated by Ricardo Rossow, was collected in the mountains near Tiltil, Chile, in January 1861 by Philippi, and is housed at the Herbarium W at the Natural History Museum, Vienna.

Ourisia serpyllifolia is one of three species in Ourisia subgenus Suffruticosae Meudt. The other two species in this subgenus are O. microphylla and O. polyantha, and these three southern Andean species share a suffruticose, many-branched habit with sessile, opposite to decussate leaves, and solitary flowers. They also have tiny glandular hairs on the regular calyx, and rectangular, linear oblong to narrowly oblong seeds.

Ourisia serpyllifolia can be distinguished from O. microphylla and O. polyantha by its leaves that are toothed and opposite but not decussate (vs. entire and decussate), lilac corollas that are yellow and hairy inside (vs. red, pink or white corollas that are glabrous inside), style distinctively bent just below stigma (vs. s-shaped style), and linear anthers (vs. reniform or kidney-shaped).

== Description ==
Ourisia serpyllifolia plants are perennial, suffruticose, many-branched herbs. The stems are woody at the base, with opposite leaves along the branches. Branches are 5–15 cm (2.0–5.9 in) long, 0.4–0.7 mm wide, with many tiny glandular hairs. Leaves are sessile or petiolate, 2.3–7.6 mm long by 1.2–5.0 mm wide (length: width ratio 1.4–2.1:1); petioles are 0.4–1.1 mm long and 0.3–0.5 mm wide. The lamina can be narrowly to broadly elliptic, ovate, obovate or rhombic, widest at, below or above the middle, with an acute apex, usually cuneate base, and toothed or notched edges. Leaves are usually densely hairy on both surfaces with tiny glandular hairs, or sometimes glabrous. Flowers are solitary and axillary, and each plant can have up to 70 or more flowers. Bracts are absent at flowering nodes. The flowers are borne on a pedicel that is up to 24 mm long and covered with densely distributed, short glandular hairs. The calyx is 2.9–4.7 mm long, regular, with all lobes divided to the base, and covered with sparsely distributed short glandular hairs. The corolla is 9.6–12.1 mm long (including the 5.4–10.2 mm long corolla tube), regular, tubular, violet or bluish, and with tiny glandular hairs on the outside, and yellow and usually hairy on the inside, and some tiny glandular hairs at the base of the filaments of two of the stamens. The corolla lobes are 2.2–2.9 mm long, spreading, and obovate. There are 4 stamens up to 6.0 mm long which are didynamous, with two long stamens that are included within the corolla tube and two short stamens that are also included within the corolla tube; a short staminode c. 0.2 mm long is also present. The style is 2.8–3.5 mm long, included, with a capitate stigma or one that is not distinct from the style. The ovary is 0.9–1.8 mm long and covered with tiny glandular hairs. Fruits are capsules 1.8–2.7 mm long and 2.2–2.6 mm wide with loculicidal and sometimes also partially septicidal dehiscence and pedicels up to 8.9 mm long. It is unknown how many tiny seeds are in each capsule, and seeds are 0.4– 0.6 mm long and 0.1–0.3 mm wide, rectangular, linear-oblong to narrowly oblong, with a two-layered, reticulate (having a net-like pattern) seed coat with long, narrow, rectangular primary reticula and regular secondary reticula.

Ourisia serpyllifolia flowers and fruits mainly December and January, rarely as early as September.

The chromosome number of Ourisia serpyllifolia is unknown.

== Distribution and habitat ==
Ourisia serpyllifolia is endemic to Chile in the Andes mountainous from 29 to 36°S latitude. It is found in the Coquimbo, Valparaíso, Santiago Metropolitan, and Maule Regions of Chile. This species is rare and can be found in rocky habitats sometimes near streams from 1,000 to 3,400 m (3,300 to 11,200 ft) above sea level.

== Phylogeny ==
One individual of O. serpyllifolia was included in phylogenetic analyses of all species of the genus Ourisia using standard DNA sequencing markers (two nuclear ribosomal DNA markers and two chloroplast DNA regions) and morphological data. Ourisia serpyllifolia was always placed with high support in the suffruticose clade, and was highly supported as sister to another suffruticose species, O. polyantha.

== Cultivation ==
The species has been successfully cultivated by rock gardening enthusiasts, and artificial interspecific hybrids have been made between it and the other two suffruticose species, O. polyantha and O. microphylla.
