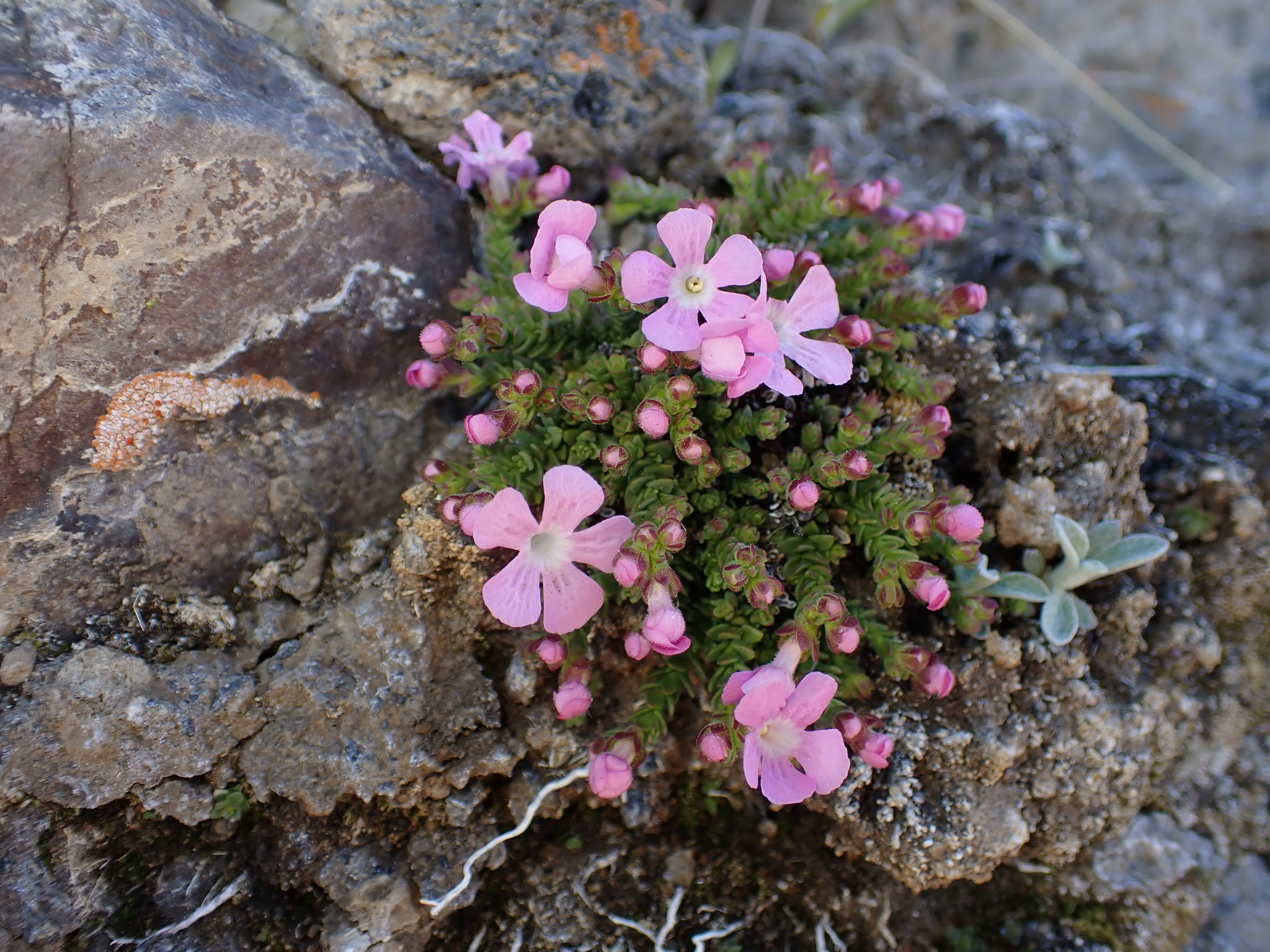
- Ourisia microphylla plant observed at Neuquén, Argentina

Scientific classification
- Kingdom: Plantae
- Clade: Embryophytes
- Clade: Tracheophytes
- Clade: Angiosperms
- Clade: Eudicots
- Clade: Asterids
- Order: Lamiales
- Family: Plantaginaceae
- Genus: Ourisia
- Species: O. microphylla

Binomial name
- Ourisia microphylla Poepp. & Endl.

= Ourisia microphylla =

Species of flowering plant

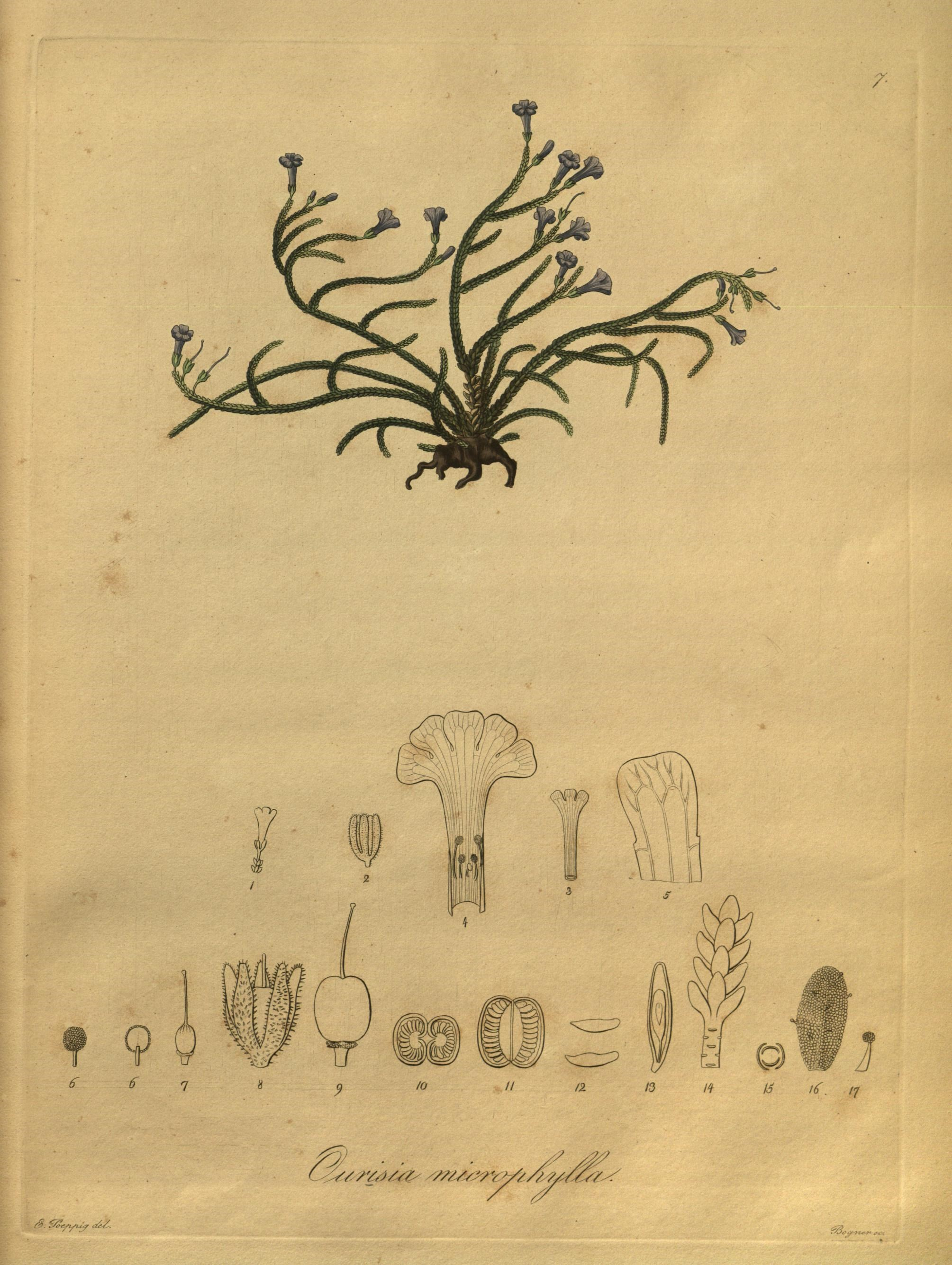
Original illustration of O. microphylla, from Nova Genera

Ourisia microphylla is a species of flowering plant in the family Plantaginaceae that is endemic to the Andes mountains of southern Chile and Argentina. Eduard Poeppig and Stephan Endlicher described O. microphylla in 1835. Plants of this species of South American foxglove are small, showy, perennial, many-branched and suffruticose with entire, decussate leaves. The flowers are solitary, with a regular calyx, and a pink to white regular corolla. The calyx has tiny glandular hairs, and the corolla tube is glabrous inside.

== Taxonomy ==
Ourisia microphylla Poepp. & Endl. is in the plant family Plantaginaceae. German botanist Eduard Poeppig and Austrian botanist Stephan Endlicher described O. microphylla in 1835 in their publication, Nova Genera.

The type material was collected by Poeppig in the Andes mountains of the Biobío Region of Chile at "Tvun Leuvu" [Truvún Leuvú (Mapuche language), or Trubunleo] and Sierra Velluda in January 1830. The lectotype was designated by Heidi Meudt and is housed at the Herbarium W at the Natural History Museum, Vienna, with isolectotypes at several other herbaria.

Ourisia microphylla is the type species of Ourisia subgenus Suffruticosae Meudt. The other two species in this subgenus are O. polyantha and O. serpyllifolia, and these three southern Andean species share a suffruticose, many-branched habit with sessile, opposite to decussate leaves, and solitary flowers. They also have tiny glandular hairs on the regular calyx, and rectangular, linear oblong to narrowly oblong seeds.

Ourisia microphylla can be distinguished from O. polyantha by its pink or white corollas that are less than 15 mm long (vs. red corollas that are yellow inside the tube and longer than 15 mm) and its short stamens less than 5 mm long, with filaments attached half-way down the corolla tube (vs. long stamens over 16 mm long, with filaments attached near the tube opening).

It can be distinguished from O. serpyllifolia by its decussate, entire leaves (vs. not decussate, and toothed), pink or white corollas that are glabrous inside (vs. lilac corollas that are yellow and hairy inside), s-shaped style (vs. style distinctively bent just below stigma), and reniform or kidney-shaped anthers (vs. linear).

== Description ==
Ourisia microphylla plants are perennial suffruticose, many-branched herbs. The stems are woody at the base, with opposite, decussate leaves along the branches. Branches are 1–13 cm (0.4–5.1 in) long, 0.2–0.9 mm wide, and glabrous except for few, tiny glandular hairs near the branch tips. Leaves are sessile, 1.0–3.9 mm long by 0.6–2.6 mm wide (length: width ratio 1.8–2.9:1). The lamina can be lanceolate, ovate, oblanceolate, obovate, elliptic or rhombic, widest below, at or above the middle, with a rounded to subacute apex, cuneate base, and smooth edges. Leaves are glabrous, but some leaves near the tips of branches have few, tiny glandular hairs. Flowers are solitary, axillary, and each plant can have up to 80 or more flowers. Bracts are absent at flowering nodes. The flowers are borne on a pedicel that is up to 5.9 mm long and has sparsely distributed, short glandular hairs. The calyx is 2.4–4.6 mm long, regular, with all lobes divided nearly to the base, and covered inside and outside with sparsely distributed short glandular hairs. The corolla is 9.8–14.5 mm long (including the 4.9–10.0 mm long corolla tube), regular, tubular-funnelform to salverform, pink, pink-purple or white and with tiny glandular hairs on the outside, and glabrous on the inside, with the exception of some glandular hairs at the base of the filaments of two or all four stamens. The corolla lobes are 2.7–5.1 mm long, spreading to explanate, and obovate. There are 4 stamens up to 5.0 mm long which are didynamous, with two long stamens that are included within the corolla tube, and two short stamens that are also included within the corolla tube; a short staminode 0.3–2.0 mm long is also present. The style is 1.3–3.4 mm long, included, with an capitate or flat stigma. The ovary is 1.1–1.6 mm long and usually glabrous. Fruits are capsules 1.7–2.7 mm long and 1.5–2.5 mm wide with loculicidal and partially septicidal dehiscence and pedicels up to 3.2 mm long. There are c. 200 tiny seeds in each capsule, and seeds are 0.6– 0.7 mm long and 0.1–0.2 mm wide, rectangular, linear-oblong to narrowly oblong, with a two-layered, reticulate (having a net-like pattern) seed coat with long, narrow, rectangular primary reticula and regular secondary reticula.

Ourisia mircophylla flowers and fruits mainly December to February, but flowering can extend to May and fruiting until April.

The chromosome number of Ourisia microphylla is 2n=16 or 32.

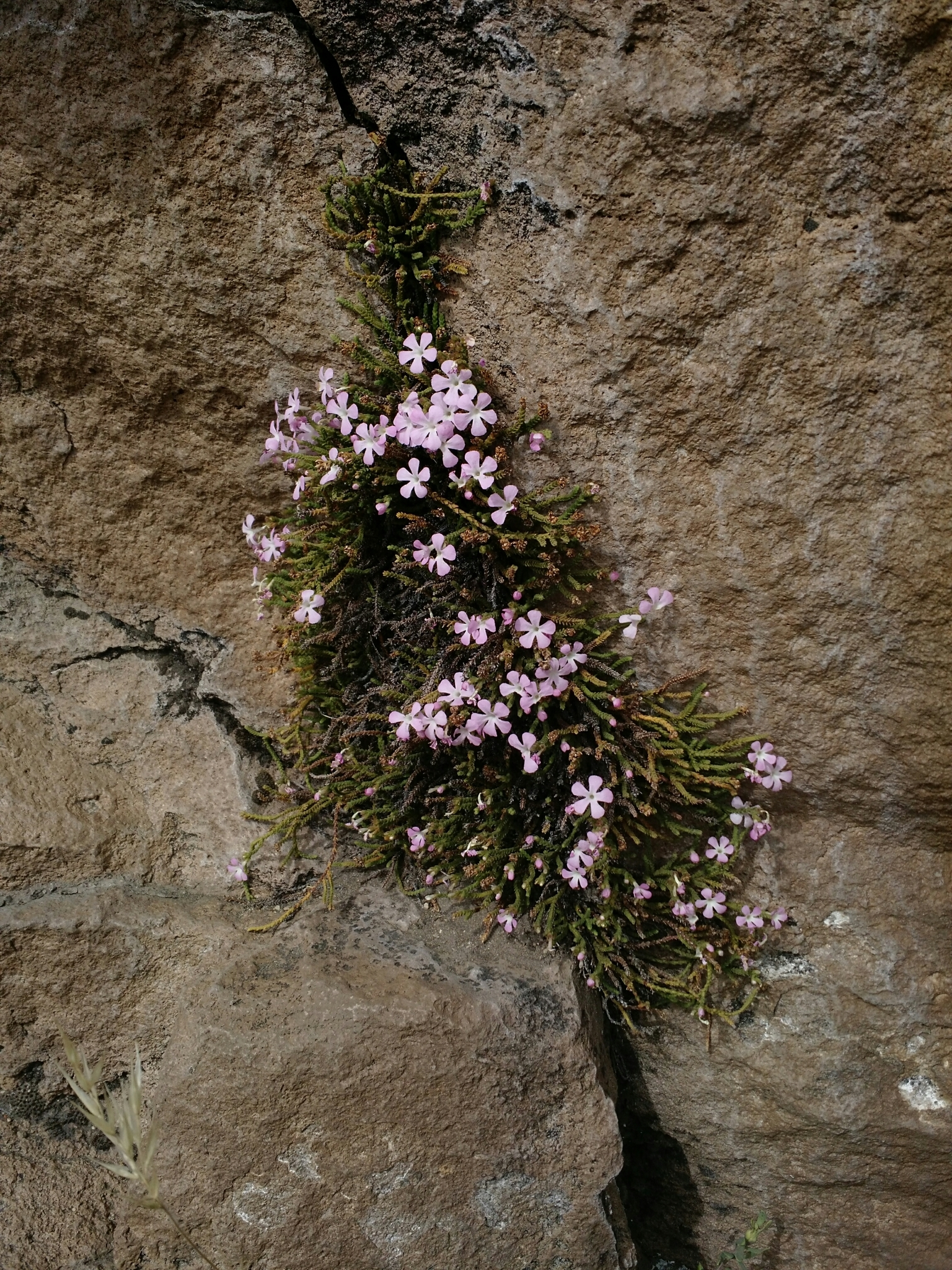
O. microphylla growing in a crevice of a rock face near Laguna del Maule, Chile

== Distribution and habitat ==
Ourisia microphylla is endemic to the Andes mountainous in southern Chile and Argentina, from 35 to 38°S latitude. In Chile, it is distributed in Maule and Biobío Region Regions, and in Argentina it is found in southern Mendoza and northern Neuquén Provinces.

O. microphylla is found from 800 to 2,200 m (2,600 to 7,200 ft) above sea level, in montane or alpine habitats, often on rock faces or in crevices, near waterfalls or streams, and can be locally abundant.

== Phylogeny ==
One individual of O. microphylla was included in phylogenetic analyses of all species of the genus Ourisia using standard DNA sequencing markers (two nuclear ribosomal DNA markers and two chloroplast DNA regions) and morphological data. Ourisia microphylla was always placed with high support in the suffruticose clade, and was highly supported as sister to the other two suffruticose species, O. polyantha and O. serpyllifolia.

== Cultivation ==
Both white- and pink-flowered Ourisia microphylla have been successfully cultivated by rock gardening enthusiasts, and artificial interspecific hybrids have been made between O. microphylla and another suffruticose species, O. polyantha. These hybrids have been named Ourisia ×bitternensis M.Sheader & A.Sheader.

== Gallery ==
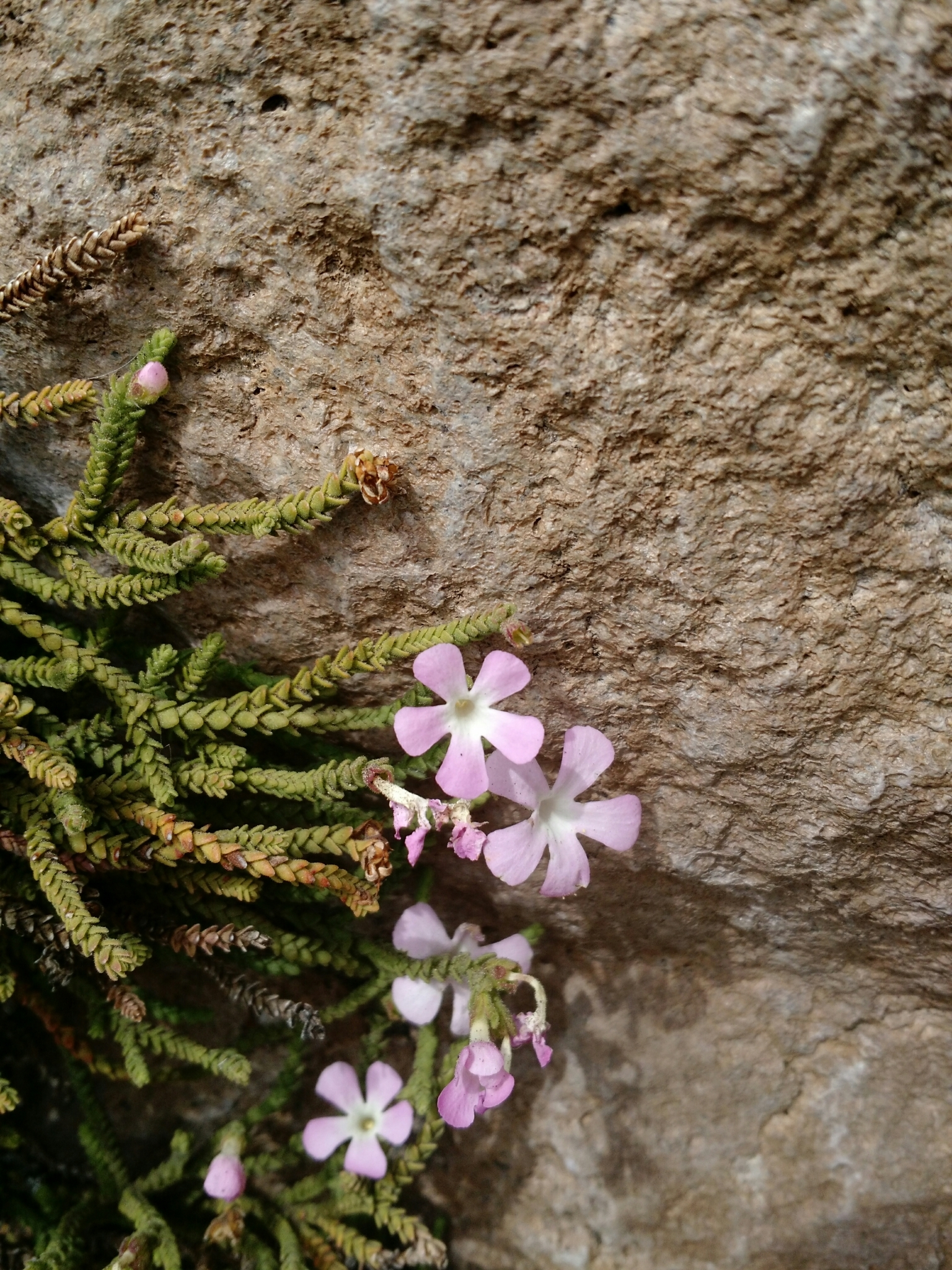
Multiple branches, leaves and flowers

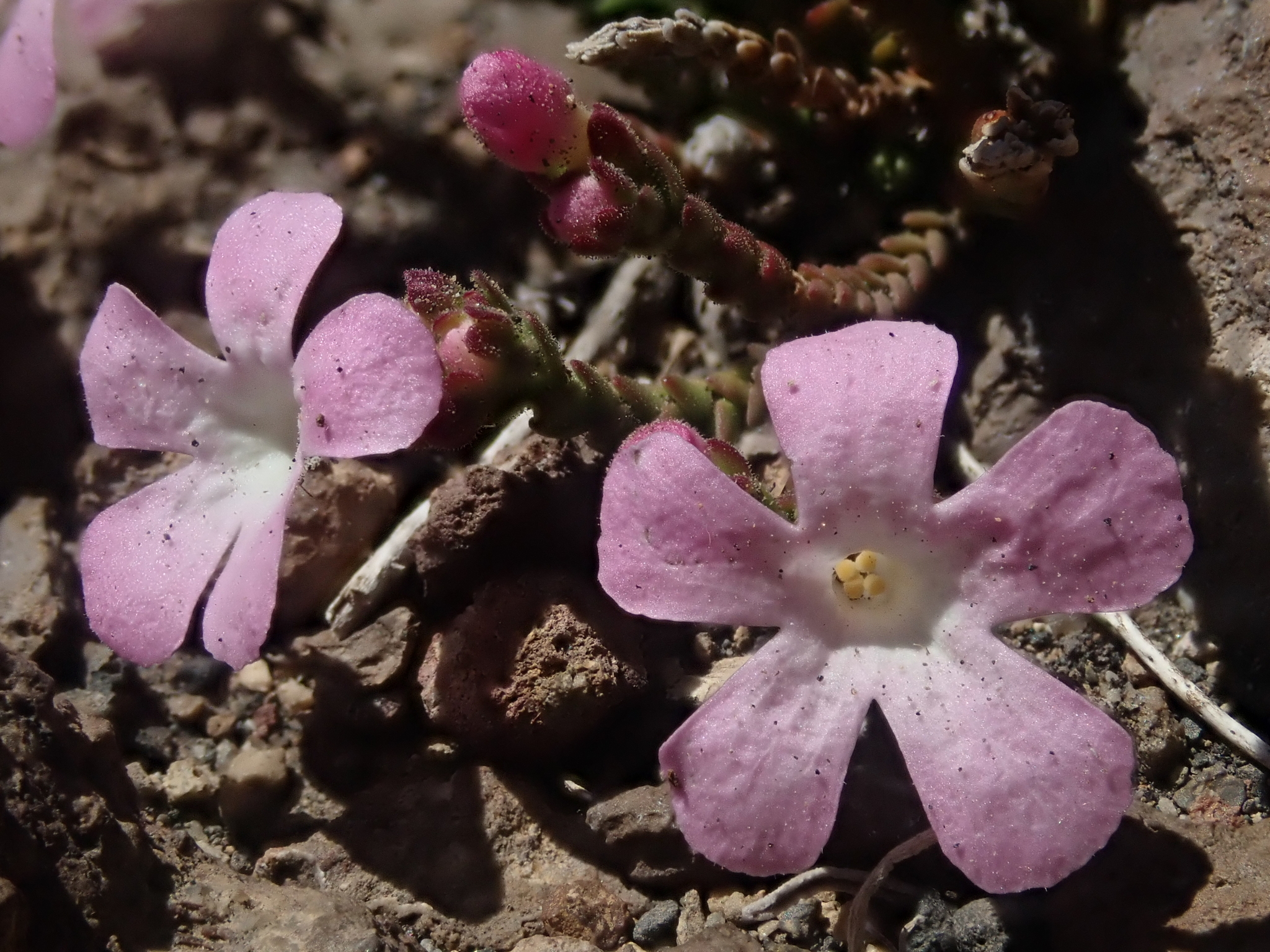
Close up of flowers

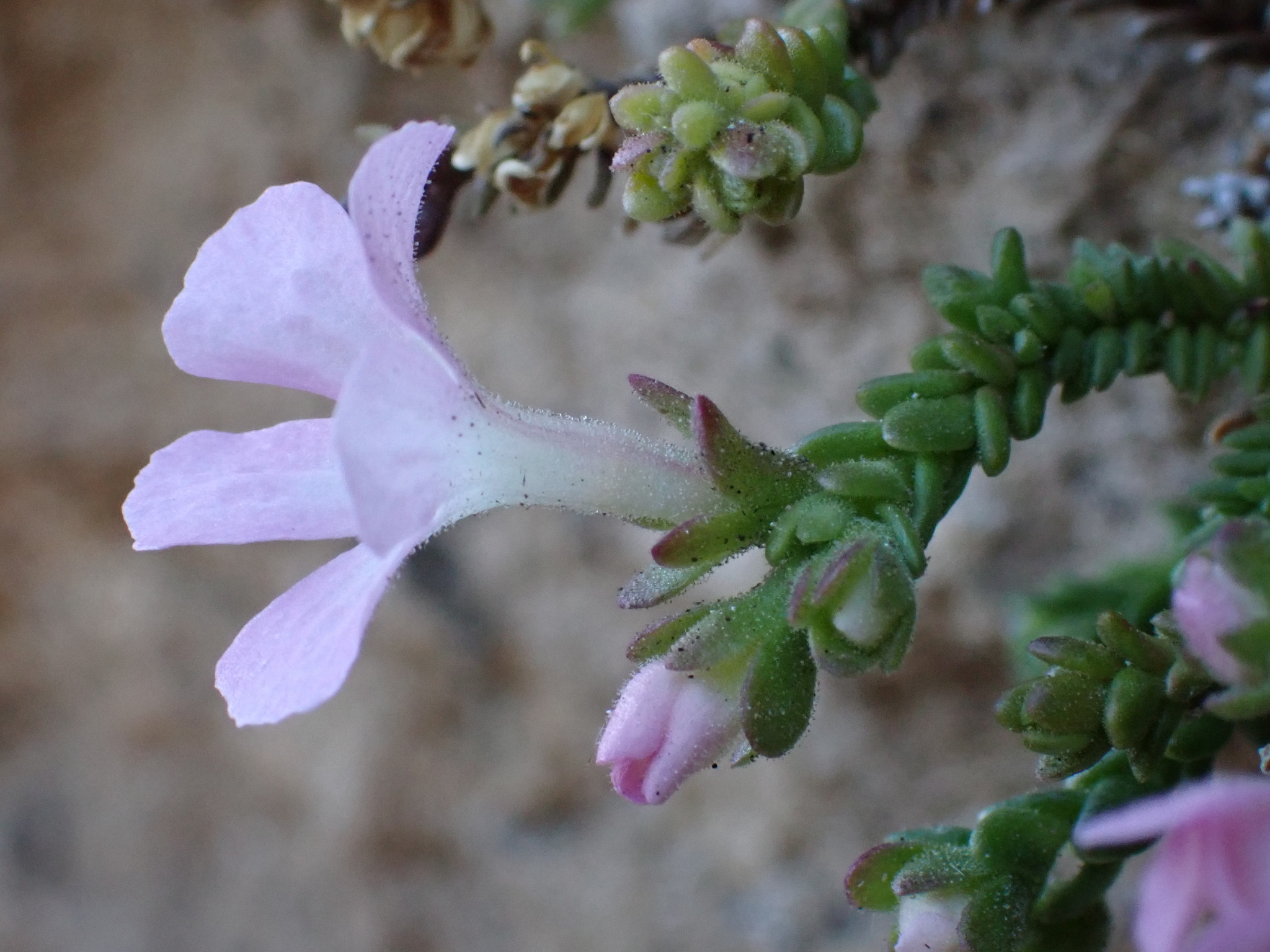
Close-up of flowers, side view. Note the tiny glandular hairs on the corolla tube, on the calyx, and on the leaves near the tip of the branch.
