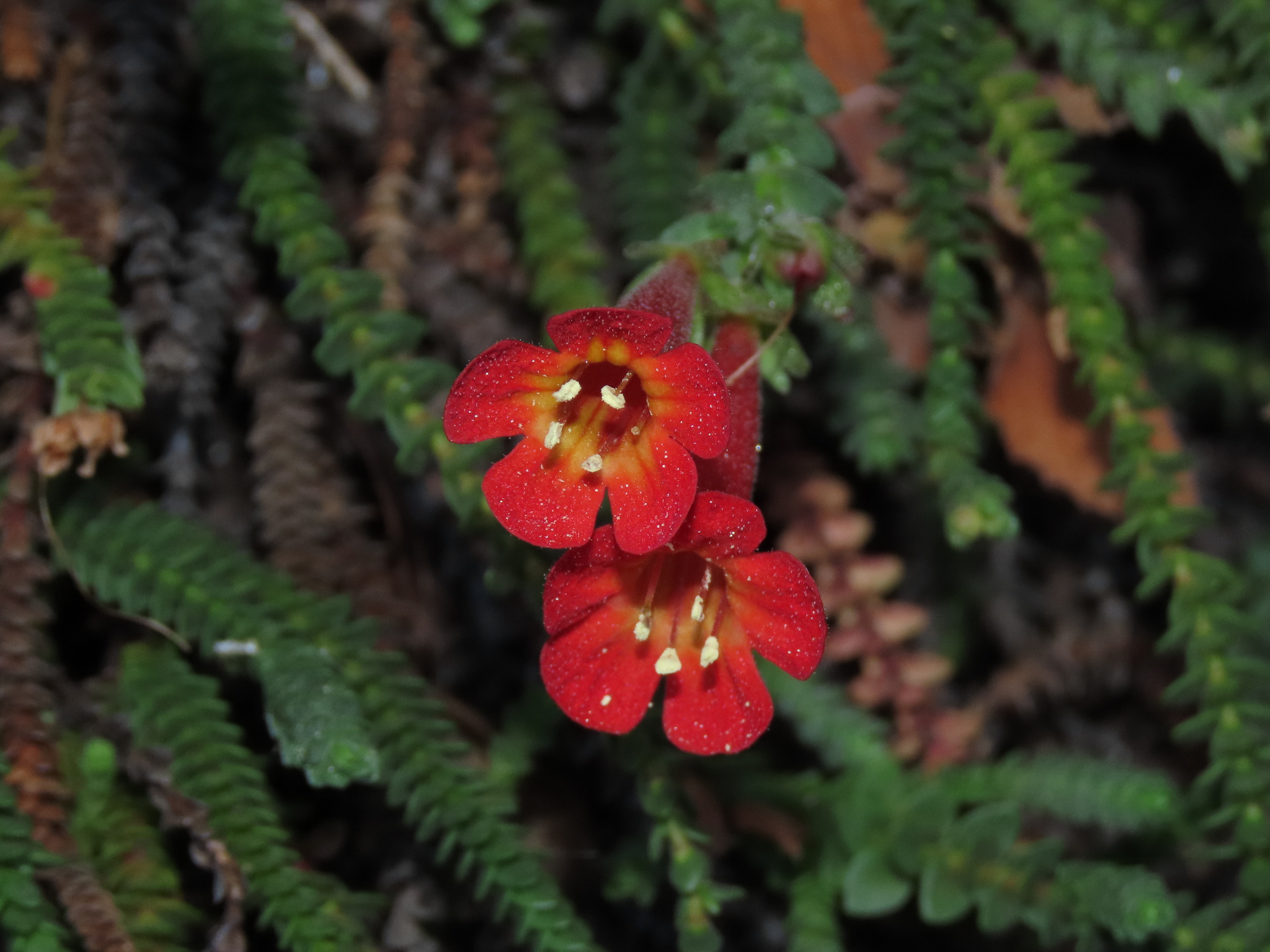
- Ourisia polyantha observed at Cerro Cantillana, Chile

Scientific classification
- Kingdom: Plantae
- Clade: Tracheophytes
- Clade: Angiosperms
- Clade: Eudicots
- Clade: Asterids
- Order: Lamiales
- Family: Plantaginaceae
- Genus: Ourisia
- Species: O. polyantha

Binomial name
- Ourisia polyantha Poepp. & Endl.

Synonyms
- Ourisia diazii Phil.

= Ourisia polyantha =

Species of flowering plant

Ourisia polyantha is a species of flowering plant in the family Plantaginaceae that is endemic to the Andes mountains of central Chile. Eduard Poeppig and Stephan Endlicher described O. polyantha in 1835. Plants of this species of South American foxglove are small, showy, perennial, many-branched and suffruticose with entire, decussate leaves. The flowers are solitary, with a regular calyx, and a regular corolla. The calyx has tiny glandular hairs, and the corolla tube is red, but yellow and glabrous inside.

== Taxonomy ==
Ourisia polyantha Poepp. & Endl. is in the plant family Plantaginaceae. German botanist Eduard Poeppig and Austrian botanist Stephan Endlicher described O. polyantha in 1835 in their publication, Nova Genera.

The type material was collected by Poeppig in the Andes mountains in Chile in December 1828. The holotype is housed at the Herbarium W at the Natural History Museum, Vienna. Ourisia diazii Phil. was described in 1864 by Rudolfo Amando Philippi and is a synonym of O. polyantha. The holotype of O. diazii was collected in the mountains near Tinguiririca in January 1861 by Wenceslao Díaz Gallegos and is housed at the Herbarium SGO in Santiago, Chile with an isotype at Herbarium PH at the Academy of Natural Sciences, US.

Ourisia polyantha is one of three species in Ourisia subgenus Suffruticosae Meudt. The other two species in this subgenus are O. microphylla and O. serpyllifolia, and these three southern Andean species share a suffruticose, many-branched habit with sessile, opposite to decussate leaves, and solitary flowers. They also have tiny glandular hairs on the regular calyx, and rectangular, linear oblong to narrowly oblong seeds.

Ourisia polyantha can be distinguished from O. microphylla by red corollas that are yellow inside the tube and longer than 15 mm (vs. pink or white corollas that are less than 15 mm long) and its long stamens over 16 mm long, with filaments attached near the tube opening (vs. short stamens less than 5 mm long, with filaments attached half-way down the corolla tube).

It can be distinguished from O. serpyllifolia by its decussate, entire leaves (vs. not decussate, and toothed), red corollas that are glabrous inside (vs. lilac corollas that are yellow and hairy inside), s-shaped style (vs. style distinctively bent just below stigma), and reniform or kidney-shaped anthers (vs. linear).

== Description ==
Ourisia polyantha plants are perennial, suffruticose, many-branched herbs. The stems are woody at the base, with opposite, decussate leaves along the branches. Branches are 7–26 cm (2.8–10.2 in) long, 0.4–1.0 mm wide, and glabrous except for few, tiny glandular hairs near the branch tips. Leaves are sessile, 1.6–6.3 mm long by 0.6–3.8 mm wide (length: width ratio 1.6–2.4:1). The lamina can be elliptic, broadly elliptic, ovate, or rhombic, widest at or below the middle, with a rounded to subacute apex, cuneate base, and smooth edges. Leaves are glabrous, but some leaves near the tips of branches have few, tiny glandular hairs. Flowers are solitary and axillary, and each plant can have up to 30 or more flowers. Bracts are absent at flowering nodes. The flowers are borne on a pedicel that is up to 10.7 mm long and is usually glabrous but sometimes has densely distributed, short glandular hairs. The calyx is 3.9–5.4 mm long, regular, with all lobes divided to the base, and covered with sparsely distributed short glandular hairs. The corolla is 20.9–25.8 mm long (including the 15.7–22.3 mm long corolla tube), regular, tubular to tubular-funnelform, reddish-orange or red, and with tiny glandular hairs on the outside, and yellow and glabrous on the inside, with the exception of some glandular hairs at the base of the filaments of two or all four stamens. The corolla lobes are 2.7–4.4 mm long, spreading, and obovate. There are 4 stamens up to 22.1 mm long which are didynamous, with two long stamens that are included within the corolla tube or reaching the tube opening, and two short stamens that are also included within the corolla tube or reaching the tube opening; a short staminode 0.3–1.7 mm long is also present. The style is 16.0–20.7 mm long, included, with a capitate stigma or one that is not distinct from the style. The ovary is 1.5–3,1 mm long and overed with tiny glandular hairs. Fruits are capsules 3.1–3.6 mm long and 2.6–3.6 mm wide with loculicidal and partially septicidal dehiscence and pedicels up to 7.8 mm long. There are c. 270 tiny seeds in each capsule, and seeds are 0.6– 0.8 mm long and 0.2–0.3 mm wide, rectangular, linear-oblong to narrowly oblong, with a two-layered, reticulate (having a net-like pattern) seed coat with long, narrow, rectangular primary reticula and subregular secondary reticula.

Ourisia polyantha flowers and fruits mainly December to February, but flowering can range from October to March, and fruiting until March.

The chromosome number of Ourisia polyantha is unknown.

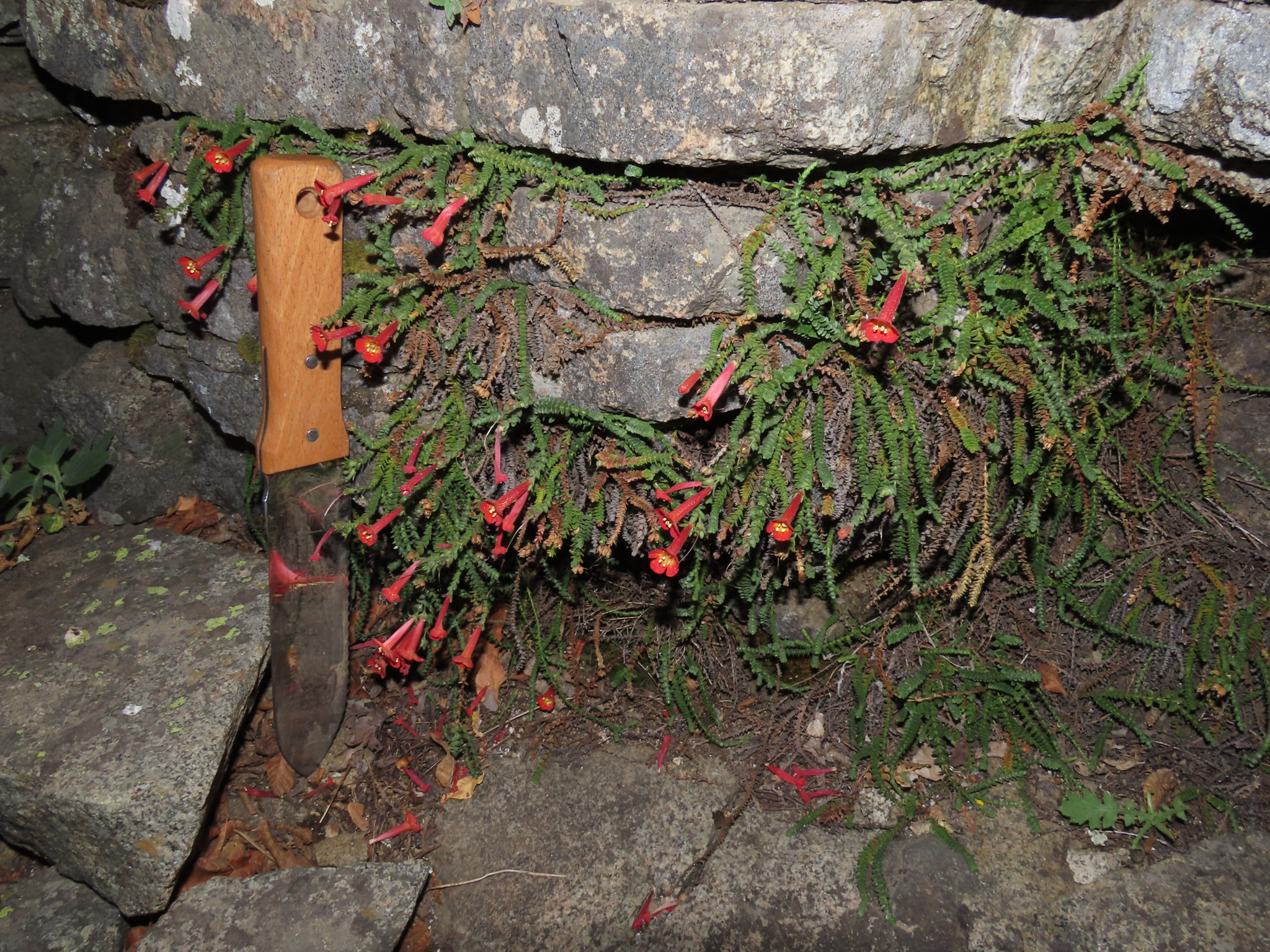
O. polyantha growing in the crevices of a rock face

== Distribution and habitat ==
Ourisia polyantha is endemic to Chile in the Andes mountainous from 33 to 35°S latitude. It is found in the Santiago Metropolitan Region and O'Higgins Region. This species is rare and can be found in rocky habitats near waterfalls or streams from 1,360 to 2,400 m (4,460 to 7,870 ft) above sea level.

== Phylogeny ==
One individual of O. polyantha was included in phylogenetic analyses of all species of the genus Ourisia using standard DNA sequencing markers (two nuclear ribosomal DNA markers and two chloroplast DNA regions) and morphological data. Ourisia polyantha was always placed with high support in the suffruticose clade, and was highly supported as sister to another suffruticose species, O. serpyllifolia.

== Cultivation ==
The species has been successfully cultivated by rock gardening enthusiasts, and artificial interspecific hybrids, which have been given the name Ourisia × bitternensis M.Sheader & A.Sheader, have been made between O. polyantha and another suffruticose species, O. microphylla.

== Gallery ==
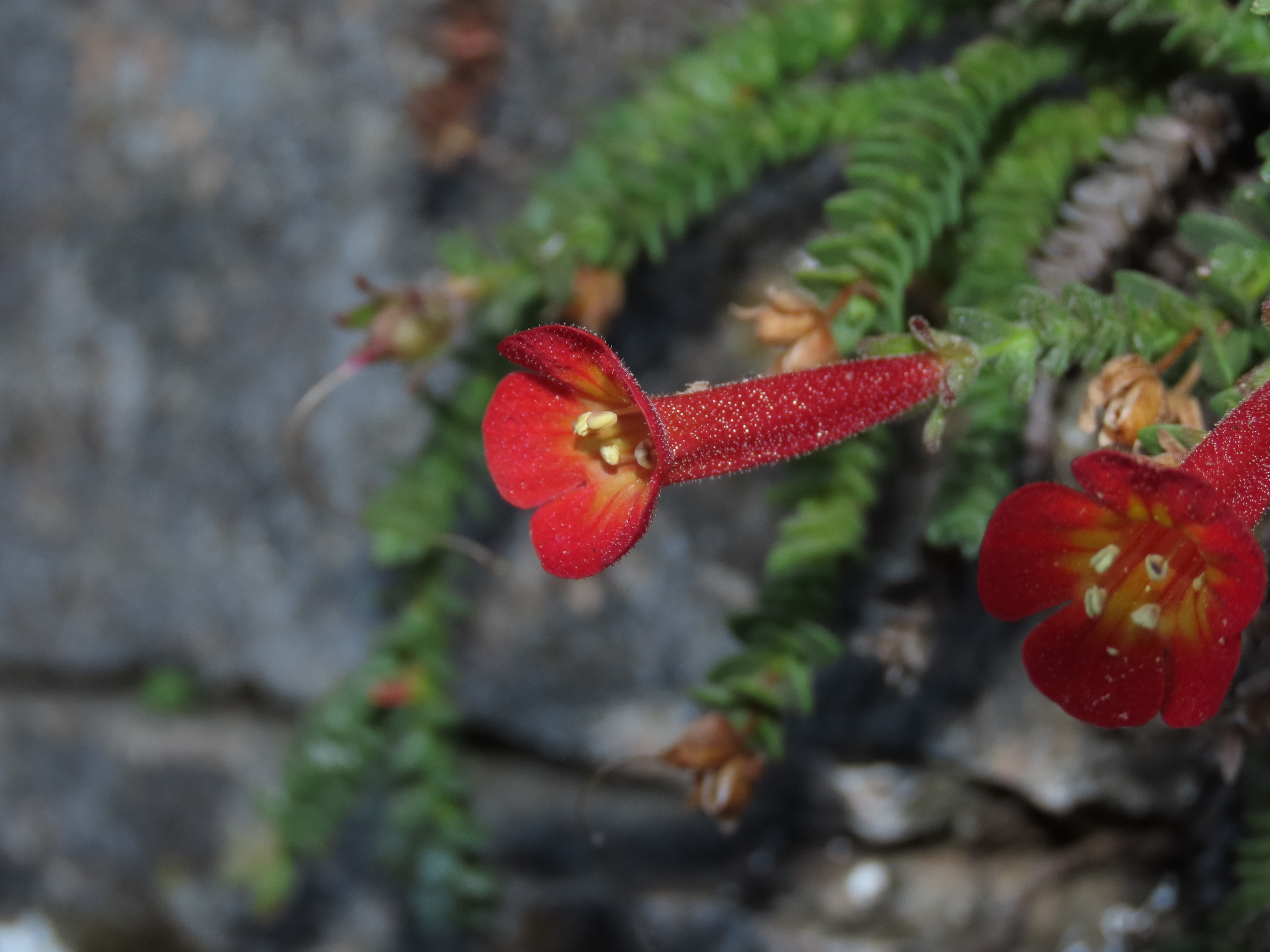
Close-up of flower, side view. Note the tiny glandular hairs on the corolla tube, on the calyx, and on the leaves near the tip of the branch.

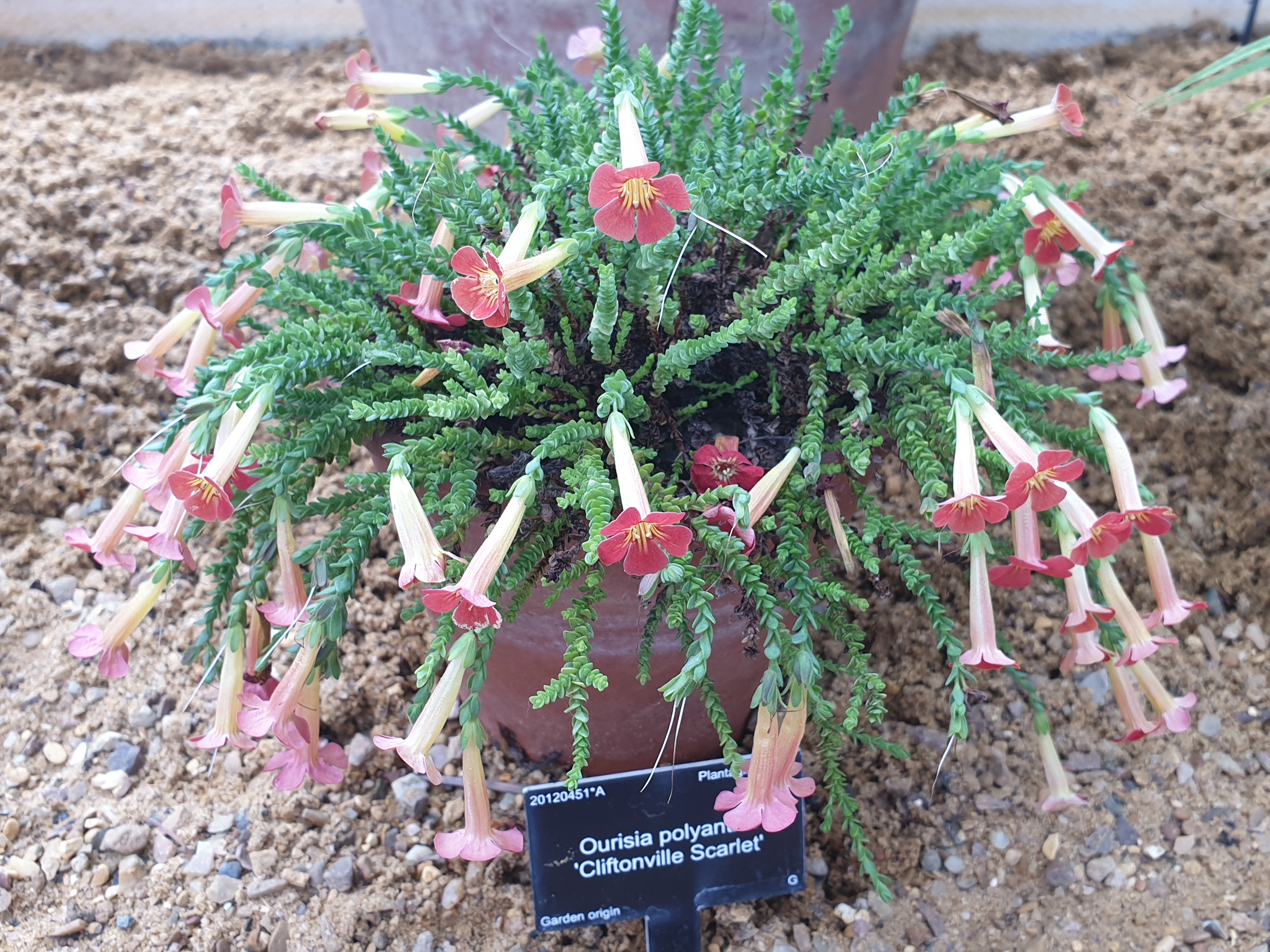
Cultivated O. polyantha

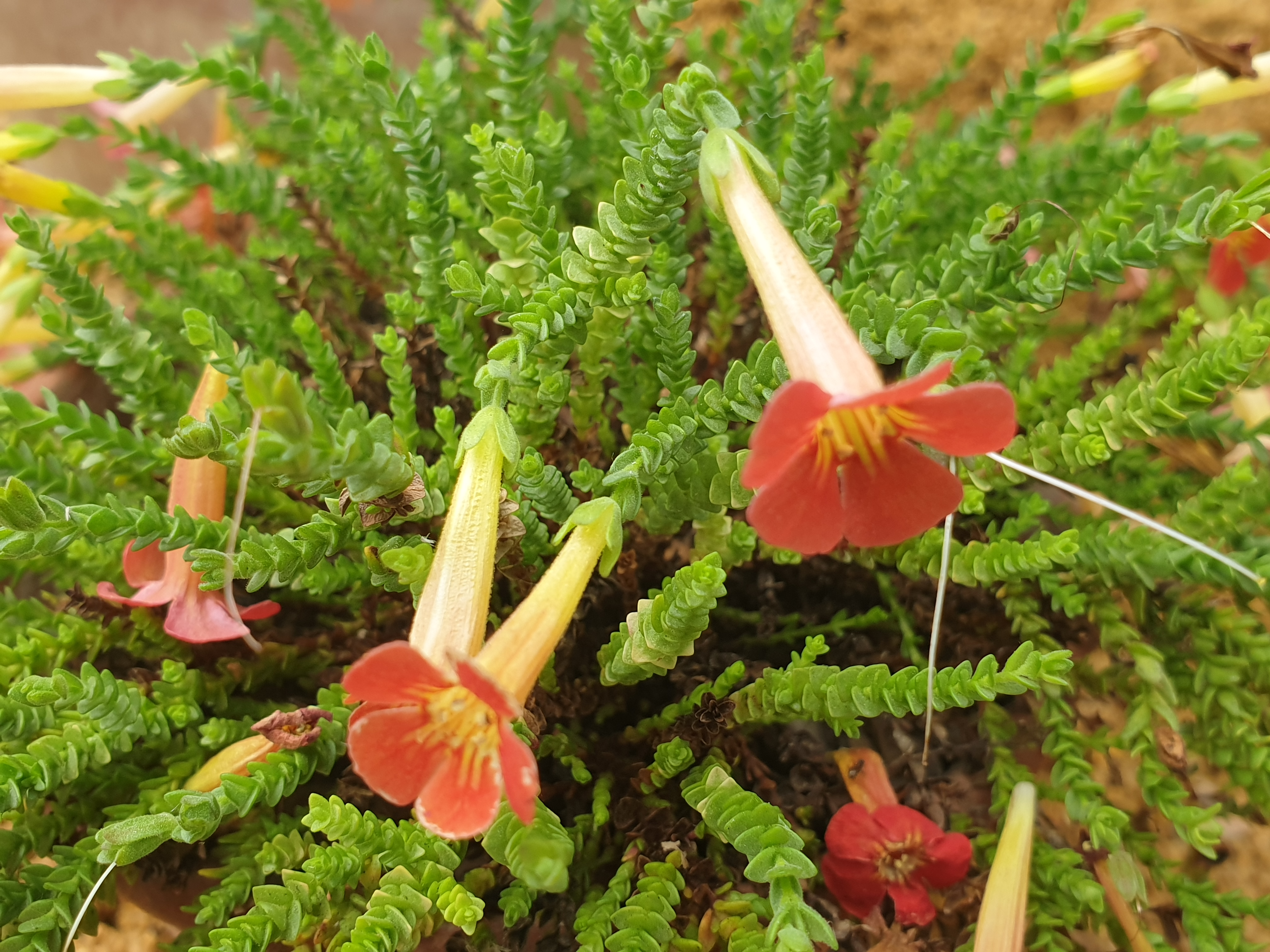
Close-up of flowers of cultivated O. polyantha
