= Maori onion =

Maori onion is a common name for one of three separate plant species in the genus Bulbinella native to New Zealand:

- Bulbinella angustifolia
- Bulbinella gibbsii
- Bulbinella hookeri
