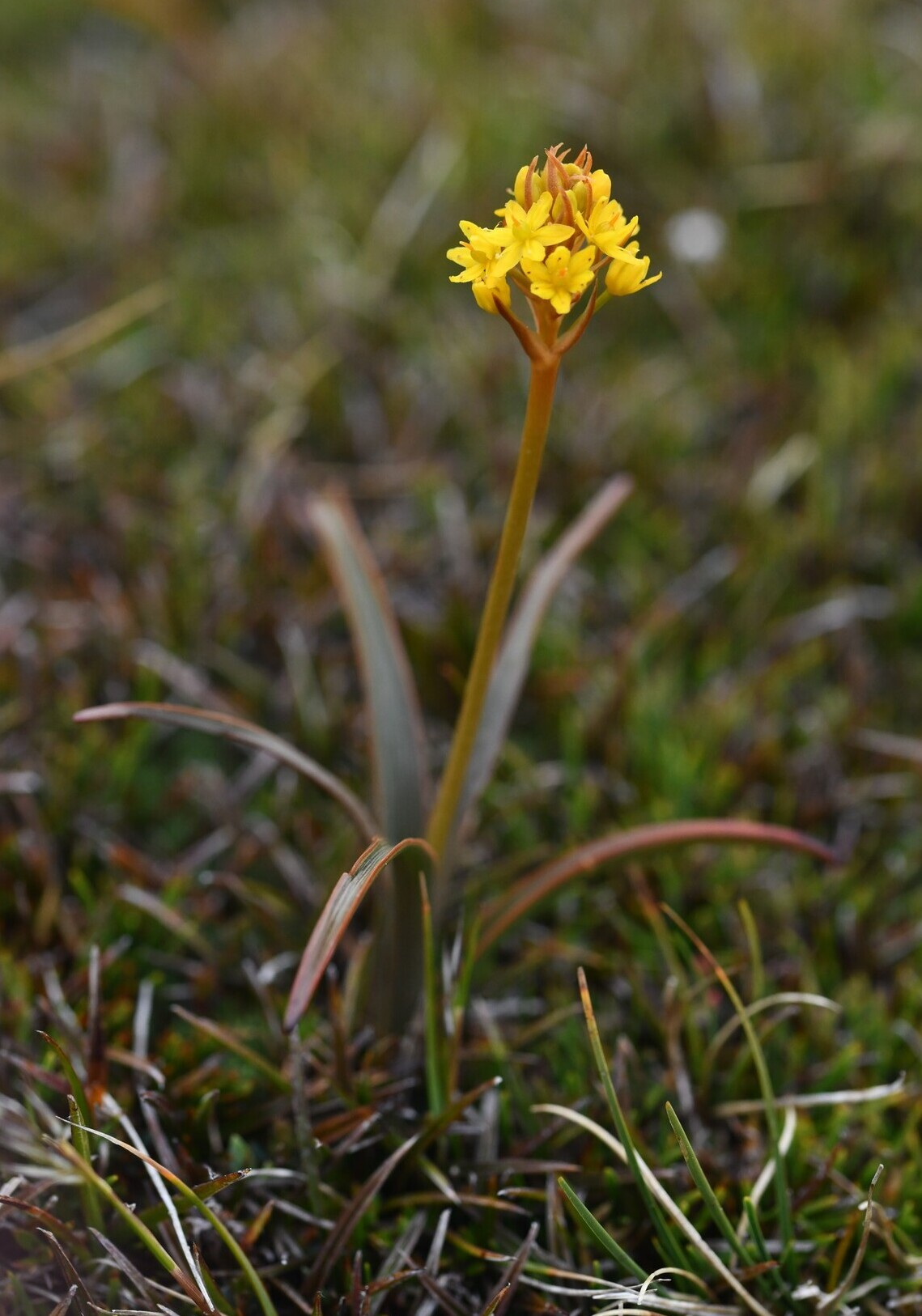
- Bulbinella gibbsii var. gibbsii

Conservation status
- Naturally Uncommon (NZ TCS)

Scientific classification
- Kingdom: Plantae
- Clade: Tracheophytes
- Clade: Angiosperms
- Clade: Monocots
- Order: Asparagales
- Family: Asphodelaceae
- Subfamily: Asphodeloideae
- Genus: Bulbinella
- Species: B. gibbsii

Binomial name
- Bulbinella gibbsii (Cockayne)

= Bulbinella gibbsii =

Species of flowering plant

Bulbinella gibbsii, commonly known as Gibbs's Māori onion, is a species of flowering plant in the family Asphodelaceae. It is endemic to New Zealand, primarily found in the South Island. B. gibbsii is typically found in cold habitats in soils with high water content, and typically in tussock grasslands. There are two recognised varieties of B. gibbsii, var. gibbsii and var. balanifera. B. gibbsii, var. gibbsii reaches a height of up to 300 mm tall, while var. balanifera can reach 600 mm tall. B. gibbsii was first described in 1909 by the New Zealand botanist Leonard Cockayne, var. balanifera was described by the botanist Lucy Moore in 1964. It gets its specific epithet, gibbsii, after the New Zealand educationalist Frederick Gibbs.

== Description ==
Bulbinella gibbsii is a species of subdioecious perennial herb in the family Asphodelaceae and the subfamily Asphodeloideae. It reaches a height of up to 300 mm tall. B gibbsii var. balanifera reaches a height of 600 mm tall, with slightly longer peduncles and pedicels compared to var. gibbsii. Its roots are tuberous. Its leaves are strap-like in character and up to 30 mm wide, reddish-green to dark-green in colour. Its racemes are usually conical in character, sometimes cylindrical, and the central axis is visible between the flowers. Its pedicels are 10–20 mm long. Its flowers are dark-yellow in colour, 10–14 mm in diameter, and typically has six tepals with anthers filled with pollen.

== Taxonomy ==
The Bulbinella genus was first established in 1843 by Carl Sigismund Kunth. Initially, six species from the Cape of Good Hope, in South Africa, were placed in the genus Bulbinella; three of them transferred from other genera and three of the species were described as new. In 1845, Joseph Dalton Hooker based his new genus Chrysobactron on B. rossii specimens collected from Campbell Island. B. rossii was first published in the Flora Antarctica by him, noting that Chrysobactron was "very nearly allied" and was similar to the South African Bulbinella genus, but he decided not to move the new genus into it. In 1906, botanist Thomas Cheeseman had doubted numerous times about the generic status of the New Zealand species and placed them in Bulbinella rather than in Chrysobactron. B. gibbsii var. gibbsii was first described by New Zealand botanist Leonard Cockayne in 1909. B. gibbsii var. balanifera was first described by Lucy Moore in 1964.

In 1952, Lucy Cranwell studied the pollination of various New Zealand plant species; in her study, she mentioned the points of similarity between the grains of South African Bulbinella species and New Zealand Chrysobactron (now known as Bulbinella) species, but no other differences were mentioned by her. There are twenty-three species in the genus Bulbinella; seventeen of which are located in South Africa, and six in New Zealand. B. gibbsii is closely allied to B. rossii, which is considerably taller reaching up to a metre in height and its inflorescences are more densely covered with flowers.

=== Varieties ===
There are two recognised varieties of B. gibbsii: which includes var. gibbsii and var. balanifera.

Names	Taxonomy	Distribution	Description	Conservation
B. var. gibbsii; Cockayne	Name: B. gibbsii var. gibbsii Described: 1909 Publication: Rep. Bot. Surv. St. Id.	Stewart Island	Height: 30 centimetres (10 inches); Flowers: Short pedicels and peduncles.; Habitat: Subalpine areas and boglands, occasionally found near ponds and small natural pools.; Sources: Moore 1964 & NZPCN 2025	Naturally Uncommon
B. var. balanifera; Moore	Name: B. gibbsii var. balanifera Described: 1964 Publication: New Zealand J. Bot	North and South Islands	Height: 60 centimetres (20 inches); Flowers: Long pedicels and peduncles.; Habitat: Alpine environments, occasionally in subalpine scrublands, and typically in tussock grasslands.; Sources: Moore 1964 & NZPCN 2025	Not Threatened

=== Etymology ===
The etymology (word origin) of B. gibbsii's genus name, Bulbinella, derives from the Greek βολβός, simply meaning 'bulb' (an underground plant storage structure). Both words Bulbine and Bulbinella translate to English as 'little bulb'. The specific epithet (second part of the scientific name), gibbsii, is named after Frederick Gibbs, a New Zealand community leader, businessman, educationalist, and naturalist. The varietal epithet, balanifera, deriving from the Latin balnus, was chosen by Moore due to the resemblance of the variety's fruit to an acorn. The species is commonly known as: Gibbs's Māori onion, Gibbs's lily, Gibbs's onion, or simply Māori onion. In Moore's 1964 revision of the genus, she mentioned that the species in Fiordland was locally known as the golden star lily.

== Distribution ==
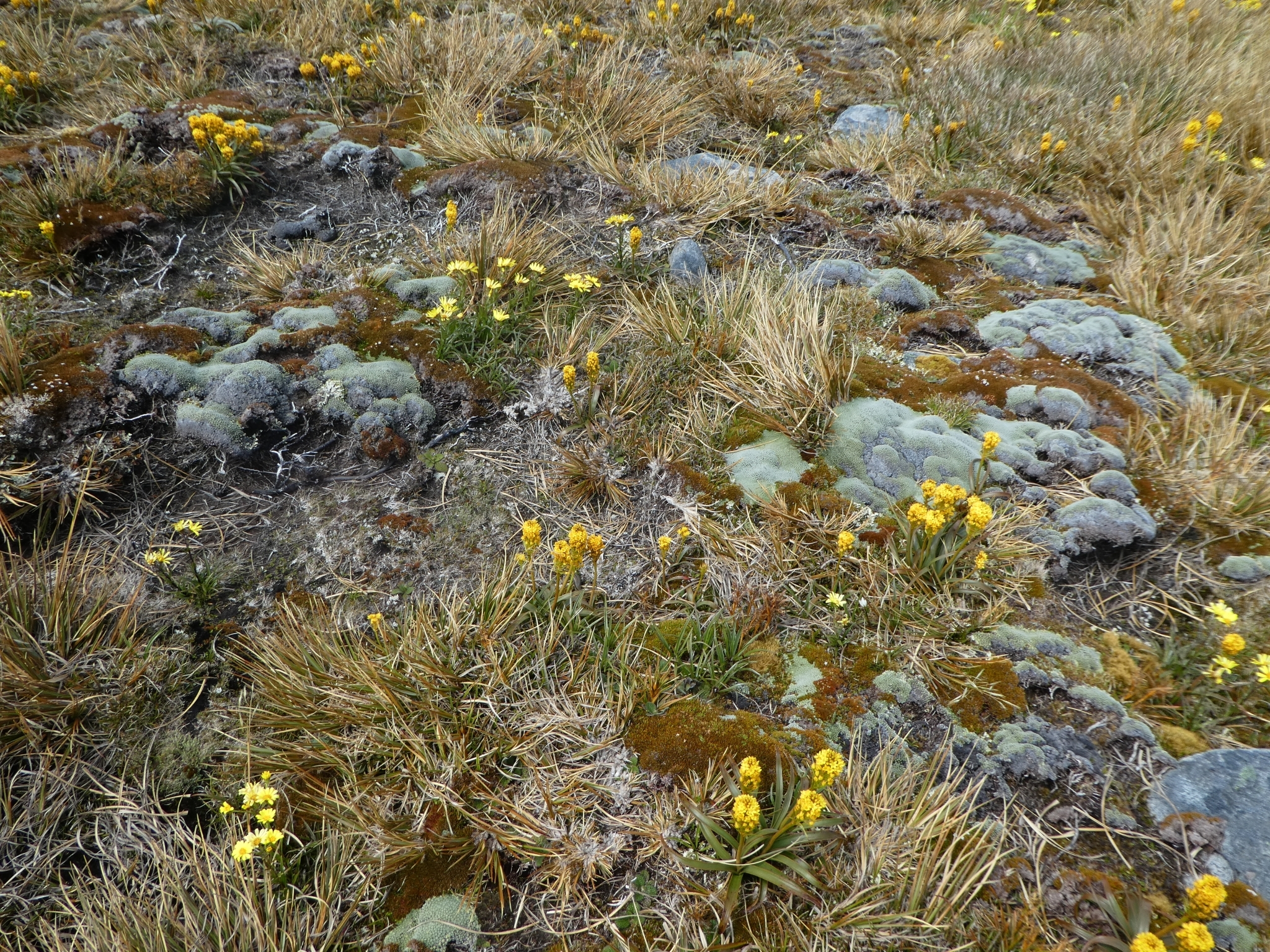
B. gibbsii var. gibbsii in its natural habitat, in a subalpine area on Stewart Island.

Bulbinella gibbsii is endemic to New Zealand. Bulbinella gibbsii var. gibbsii's range is restricted to the Stewart Island, however, var. balanifera has a more widespread range covering the North and South Islands. In the North Island, var. balanifera is only found in the Tararua Ranges and the southern portion of the Ruahine Ranges. In the South Island, var. balanifera is more common, occurring from Arthur's Pass south to Fiordland. B. gibbsii var. gibbsii's 2023 assessment in the New Zealand Threat Classification System was "At Risk — Naturally Uncommon". B. gibbsii var. balanifera's assessment was "Not Threatened".

=== Habitat ===
New Zealand's Bulbinella species prefer colder habitats and soils with high water content. B. gibbsii var. gibbsii typically occurs in boglands and subalpine areas, occasionally found in ponds and small natural pools. It occurs from near sea level to almost of the summit of Mount Anglem. B. gibbsii var. gibbsii is typically found above 1,600 ft (490 m) in elevation; but it is also abundant near sea level. B. gibbsii var. balanifera occurs in alpine environments, typically in tussock grasslands, occasionally in subalpine scrublands, and likely reaching 4,500 ft (1,400 m) in elevation. It commonly coincides with Chionochloa oreophila and C. pallens.

== Ecology ==
Despite B. gibbsii being locally abundant in Fiordland, one of the main distribution areas for the flightless and endemic bird, the takahē (Porphyrio hochstetteri), the plant is not a preferred food source for the bird. However, another study found that B. gibbsii was consumed by red deer (Cervus elaphus). B. gibbsii is likely pollinated by insects, such as bees and flies, and its seeds are later dispersed by the wind.

== Uses ==
Evidence presented by a 1971 study suggests that the indigenous Māori people wove leaves from B. gibbsii var. balanifera into plaited baskets and floor mats. There are no other recorded uses of Bulbinella species by Māori in academic literature and artefacts.

== Works cited ==
Books

- Cheeseman, T. F. (1906). Manual of the New Zealand flora (1 ed.). Wellington, New Zealand: New Zealand Board of Science and Art – via the Internet Archive.
- Cockayne, Leonard (1909). Report on a Botanical Survey of Stewart Island (PDF). Wellington, New Zealand: Department of Lands and Survey – via Papers Past.
- Cranwell, Lucy May (1952). New Zealand pollen studies: the monocotyledons: a comparative account. Auckland, New Zealand: Harvard University Press – via the Internet Archive.
- Gledhill, David (6 March 2008). The Names of Plants. Cambridge, United Kingdom: Cambridge University Press. ISBN 978-0-521-68553-5.
- Hooker, Joseph Dalton (1859). The Botany of the Antarctic Voyage of H.M. Discovery Ships Erebus and Terror in the years 1839–1843, under the Command of Captain Sir James Clark Ross. London, United Kingdom: Reeve Brothers – via the Internet Archive.
- Perry, Pauline L. (1999). Bulbinella in South Africa. Pretoria, South Africa: National Botanical Institute. ISBN 1-919795-46-4 – via the Internet Archive.

Journals

- Bee, Jennie N.; Wright, David M.; Tanentzap, Andrew J.; Lee, William G.; Lavers, Roger B.; Mills, James A.; Mark, Alan F.; Coomes, David A. (2010). "Spatio‐temporal feeding selection of red deer in a mountainous landscape". Austral Ecology. 35 (7): 752–764. doi:10.1111/j.1442-9993.2009.02082.x. ISSN 1442-9985.
- Goulding, Jeanne H. (1971). "Identification of Archaeological and Ethnological Specimens of Fibre-Plant Material Used by the Maori". Records of the Auckland Institute and Museum. 8. Auckland War Memorial Museum: 57–102. ISSN 0067-0464. JSTOR 42906164.
- Halloy, S. (1990). "A morphological classification of plants, with special reference to the New Zealand alpine flora". Journal of Vegetation Science. 1 (3): 291–304. doi:10.2307/3235704. ISSN 1100-9233.
- Mills, J. A.; Lavers, R. B.; Lee, W. G. (1984). "The Takahe — A Relict of the Pleistocene Grassland Avifauna of New Zealand". New Zealand Journal of Ecology. 7. New Zealand Ecological Society: 57–70. ISSN 0110-6465. JSTOR 24052703.
- Moore, L. B. (1964). "The New Zealand Species of Bulbinella (Liliaceae)". New Zealand Journal of Botany. 2 (3): 286–304. doi:10.1080/0028825X.1964.10443948. ISSN 0028-825X.
- Musara, Collen; Spies, Paula; Spies, Johanne J.; Stedje, Brita (2017). "A review of Bulbinella (Asphodelaceae): distribution, conservation status, and economic importance". Botanical Sciences. 95 (2): 155–168. doi:10.17129/botsci.696. ISSN 2007-4476.
- Perry, P.L. (1987). "A synoptic review of the genus Bulbinella (Asphodelaceae) in South Africa". South African Journal of Botany. 53 (6): 431–444. doi:10.1016/S0254-6299(16)31377-1. ISSN 0254-6299.
- Richardson, Alistair T.B.; Lord, Janice M.; Perry, Nigel B. (2017). "Phenylanthraquinones and flavone-C-glucosides from the disjunct Bulbinella in New Zealand". Phytochemistry. 134: 64–70. doi:10.1016/j.phytochem.2016.11.014. ISSN 0031-9422.
- Rose, A. B.; Harrison, J. B. J.; Platt, K. H. (1988). "Alpine tussockland communities and vegetation-landform-soil relationships, Wapiti Lake, Fiordland, New Zealand". New Zealand Journal of Botany. 26 (4): 525–540. doi:10.1080/0028825X.1988.10410659. ISSN 0028-825X.
- Stewart, G.H.; Harrison, J.B.J. (1987). "Physical influences on forest types and deer habitat, northern Fiordland, New Zealand". New Zealand Journal of Ecology. 10. New Zealand Ecological Society: 1–10. ISSN 0110-6465. JSTOR 24052784.

Miscellaneous

- De Lange, Peter J.; Gosden, Jane; Courtney, Shannel; Fergus, Alexander Jon; Barkla, John W.; Beadel, S. M.; Champion, Paul D.; Hindmarsh-Walls, Rowan; Makan, Troy; Michel, Pascale (29 October 2024). "Conservation status of vascular plants in Aotearoa New Zealand, 2023" (PDF). Department of Conservation. ISSN 2324-1713. Archived (PDF) from the original on 10 February 2025.
- Tunnicliff, Shirley (1996). "Gibbs, Frederick Giles". Te Ara: The Encyclopedia of New Zealand. Archived from the original on 14 December 2024.
- "Bulbinella gibbsii var. balanifera". New Zealand Plant Conservation Network. 2025. Archived from the original on 19 April 2025.
- "Bulbinella gibbsii var. gibbsii". New Zealand Plant Conservation Network. 2025. Archived from the original on 14 May 2025.
