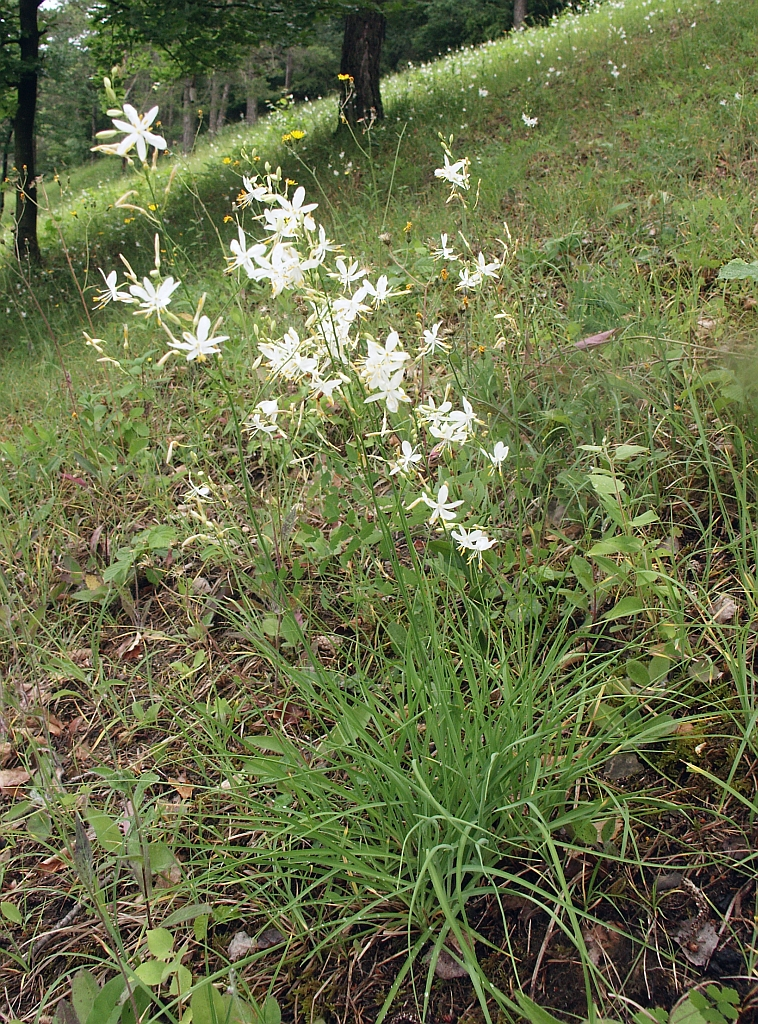
- St. Bernard's lily, Anthericum ramosum

Scientific classification
- Kingdom: Plantae
- Clade: Tracheophytes
- Clade: Angiosperms
- Clade: Monocots
- Order: Asparagales
- Family: Asparagaceae
- Subfamily: Agavoideae
- Tribe: Anthericeae
- Genus: Anthericum; L.

Synonyms
- Endogona Raf.; Liliago L. ex C.Presl 1845, illegitimate homonym, not Heister 1755; Phalangium Mill.; Pessularia Salisb.; Phalangites Bubani

= Anthericum =

Genus of flowering plants

Anthericum is a genus of rhizomatous perennial plants in the family Asparagaceae, subfamily Agavoideae. It was formerly placed in its own family, Anthericaceae. The species have rhizomatous or tuberous roots, long narrow leaves and branched stems carrying starry white flowers. The members of this genus occur mainly in the tropics and southern Africa and Madagascar, but are also represented in Europe.

The generic name Anthericum is derived from the Greek word ανθερικος (antherikos), meaning "straw", referring to the narrow leaves.

Only two species are in general cultivation. A number of species are now included in the genus Chlorophytum, the Spider Plant, a familiar and popular house plant. Others, including the St. Bruno's Lily, are now classed in the genus Paradisea.

== Species ==
Eight species are accepted.

- Anthericum angustifolium Hochst. ex A.Rich.
- Anthericum baeticum (Boiss.) Steud.
- Anthericum × confusum Domin
- Anthericum corymbosum Baker
- Anthericum jamesii Baker
- Anthericum japonicum Thunb.
- Anthericum maurum Rothm.
- Anthericum neghellense (Cufod.) Bjorå & Sebsebe
- Anthericum liliago L. – St. Bernard's lily
- Anthericum ramosum L.

=== Formerly placed here ===
- Arthropodium cirrhatum (G.Forst.) R.Br. (as A. cirrhatum G.Forst.)
- Bulbine frutescens (L.) Willd. (as A. frutescens L.)
- Bulbine longiscapa (Jacq.) Willd. (as A. longiscapum Jacq.)
- Bulbinella hookeri (Colenso ex Hook.) Cheeseman (as A. hookeri (Colenso ex Hook.) Hook.f.)
- Bulbinella nutans subsp. nutans (as A. nutans Thunb.)
- Chlorophytum bichetii (Karrer) Backer (as A. bichetii hort. ex Backer, nom. inval.)
- Chlorophytum capense (L.) Voss (as A. elatum Aiton)
- Chlorophytum macrophyllum (A.Rich.) Asch. (as A. macrophyllum A.Rich.)
- Eccremis coarctata (Ruiz & Pav.) Baker (as A. coarctatum Ruiz & Pav.)
- Echeandia flavescens (Schult. & Schult.f.) Cruden (as A. flavescens Schult. & Schult.f. and A. torreyi Baker)
- Drimia fragrans (Jacq.) J.C.Manning & Goldblatt (as A. fragrans Jacq.)
- Drimia physodes (Jacq.) Jessop (as A. physodes Jacq.)
- Narthecium ossifragum (L.) Huds. (as A. ossifragum L.)
- Pasithea caerulea (Ruiz & Pav.) D.Don (as A. caeruleum Ruiz & Pav.)
- Simethis planifolia (Vand. ex L.) Gren. & Godr. (as A. planifolium Vand. ex L.)
