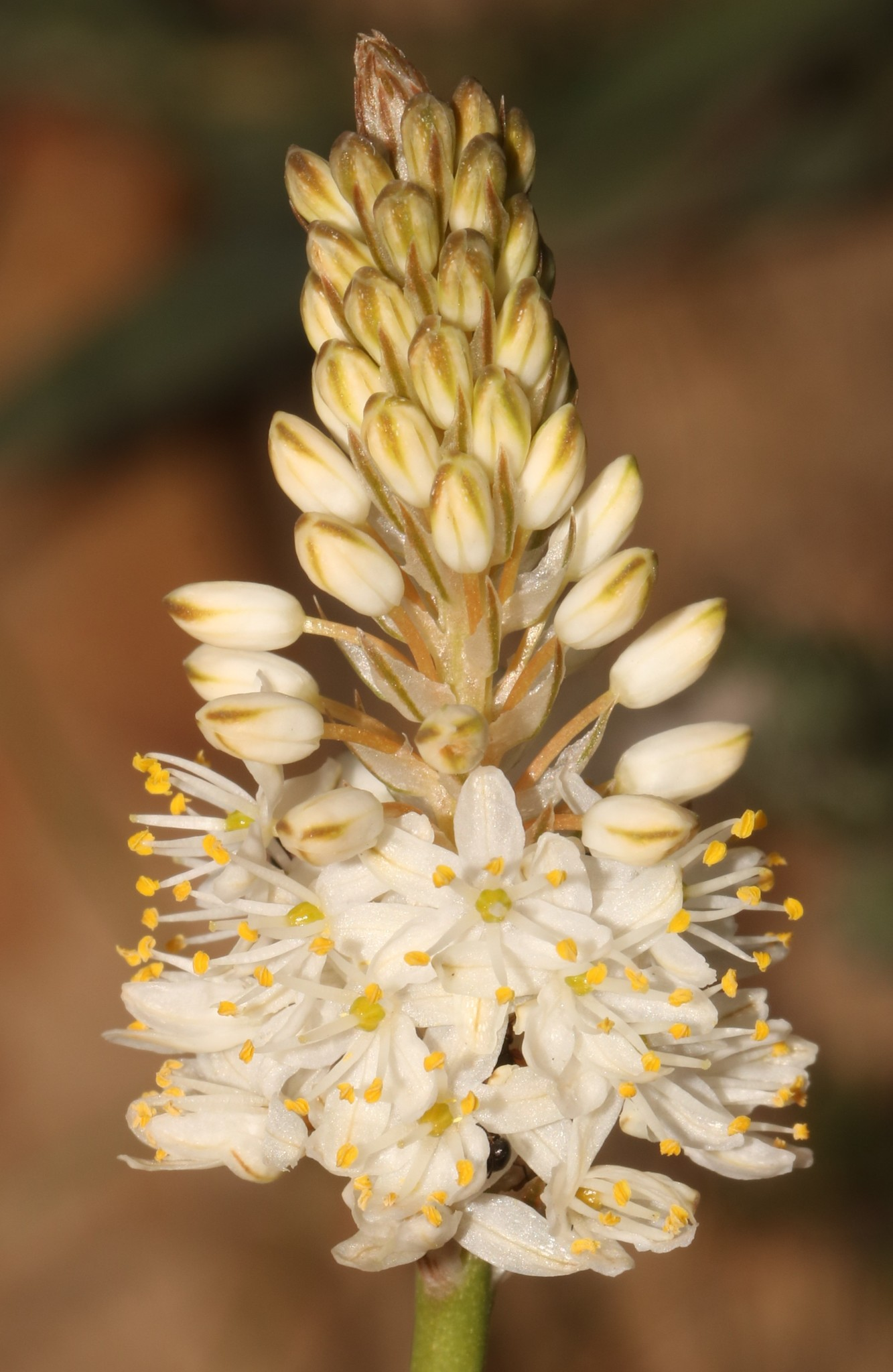

Scientific classification
- Kingdom: Plantae
- Clade: Tracheophytes
- Clade: Angiosperms
- Clade: Monocots
- Order: Asparagales
- Family: Asphodelaceae
- Subfamily: Asphodeloideae
- Genus: Bulbinella
- Species: B. barkerae

Binomial name
- Bulbinella barkerae P.L.Perry, 1987

= Bulbinella barkerae =

Species of flowering plant

Bulbinella barkerae is a species of plant in the family Asphodelaceae. It is found in the Cape Province of South Africa.

== Description ==
B. barkerae reaches up to 0.6 meters in height. It has ciliate leaf-margins, and relatively few, broad leaves.

The cream-white flowers are distinctively fragrant (unlike those of the similar Bulbinella cauda-felis). They appear in September and October, on a thin, cylindrical, apically pointed raceme.

== Distribution and habitat ==
It is endemic to the southern parts of the Western Cape Province, South Africa. It naturally occurs in the regions of Caledon, Bredasdorp, Potberg, Swellendam and Riversdale.

Its preferred habitat is flat or gently sloping terrain, often of rocky shale or clay, in renosterveld vegetation.
