= Zygotritonia =

Scientific classification
- Kingdom: Plantae
- Clade: Tracheophytes
- Clade: Angiosperms
- Clade: Monocots
- Order: Asparagales
- Family: Iridaceae
- Subfamily: Crocoideae
- Tribe: Watsonieae
- Genus: Zygotritonia; Mildbr.

Type species
- Zygotritonia bongensis (Pax) Mildbraed

Species
- See text

Genus of flowering plants

Zygotritonia is a genus of herbaceous, perennial and bulbous plants in the family Iridaceae. It contains four species distributed throughout sub-Saharan Africa. The genus name is derived from the word zygomorphic (meaning bilabiate), and the apparent resemblance to some species in the genus Tritonia.

== Species ==
The list of Zygotritonia species, with their complete name and authority, and their geographic distribution is given below.

- Zygotritonia atropurpurea Goldblatt (2019). Northern Zambia.
- Zygotritonia bongensis (Pax) Mildbr., Bot. Jahrb. Syst. 58: 230 (1923). West Tropical Africa to Socotra.
- Zygotritonia hysterantha Goldblatt, Bull. Mus. Natl. Hist. Nat., B, Adansonia, IV, 11: 208 (1989). Central African Republic.
- Zygotritonia nyassana Mildbr., Bot. Jahrb. Syst. 58: 231 (1923). Western Tanzania to Zambia.
- Zygotritonia praecox Stapf, Hooker's Icon. Pl. 32: t. 3120 (1933). Western Tropical Africa, Western Ethiopia.

== Bibliography ==
- Goldblatt, P.; Manning, J.C.; Demissew, Sebsebe; Malakasi, P.; Forest, F. (September 2016). "Relationships of the sub-Saharan African genus Zygotritonia Mildbr. (Iridaceae: Crocoideae) inferred from molecular analysis". South African Journal of Botany. 106: 5–7. doi:10.1016/j.sajb.2016.05.013.
