= Frederick Gibbs =

Frederick Gibbs may refer to:

- Frederick J. Gibbs (1899–1963), World War I flying ace
- Frederick Gibbs (educationalist) (1866–1953), New Zealand school principal, educationalist and community leader
- Frederick S. Gibbs (1845–1903), American politician from New York
- Frederick Waymouth Gibbs (1821–1898), governor and tutor of Edward VII

== See also ==
- Frederic A. Gibbs (1903–1992), American neurologist
- Freddie Gibbs (born 1982), American rapper
