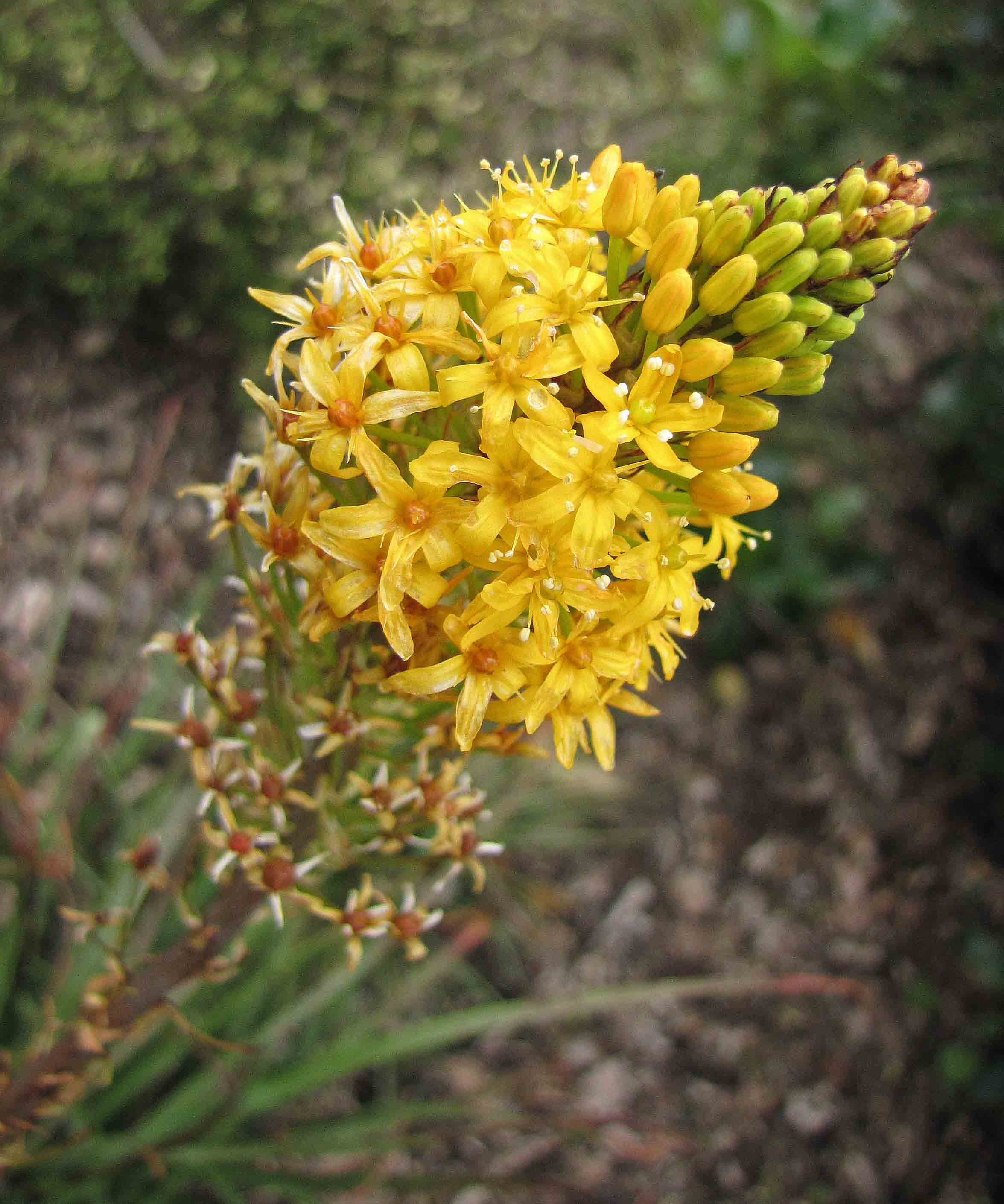
- Bulbinella hookeri

Conservation status
- Not Threatened (NZ TCS)

Scientific classification
- Kingdom: Plantae
- Clade: Tracheophytes
- Clade: Angiosperms
- Clade: Monocots
- Order: Asparagales
- Family: Asphodelaceae
- Subfamily: Asphodeloideae
- Genus: Bulbinella
- Species: B. hookeri

Binomial name
- Bulbinella hookeri (Colenso ex Hook.)

= Bulbinella hookeri =

Species of flowering plant

Bulbinella hookeri, commonly known as the Māori lily, is a species of flowering plant in the family Asphodelaceae. It is endemic to New Zealand; its range covers the North, South, and Stewart Islands. It is commonly found in tussock grasslands, and in soils with high water content. B. hookeri reaches a height of up to 120 cm (50 in) tall. B. hookeri was first described in 1851 by the botanists Joseph Dalton Hooker and William Colenso as Chrysobactron hookeri. It gets its specific epithet, hookeri, after Hooker, who first described the species with Colenso.

== Description ==
Bulbinella hookeri is a species of perennial herb in the family Asphodelaceae and the subfamily Asphodeloideae. It reaches 120 cm (50 in) in height. Its leaves are strap-like in character and usually smooth and narrow, the longest and widest leaves were measured at 75 cm (30 in) long and 30 cm (10 in), respectively. B. hookeri's flowers are bright yellow in colour. Its roots are tuberous. Its peduncles are 15–50 mm × 2.5–7 mm long, the racemes are 7.5–40 × 1.5–2.3 cm long, its pedicels are usually about 1.5 mm long, but can be 4 mm long. Its capsules are 7–9 × 4–5.5 mm long. Its infructescences (fruit clusters) are usually arranged above the leaves. Its seeds are approximately 5–6 mm long.

== Taxonomy ==
The Bulbinella genus was first established in 1843 by Carl Sigismund Kunth. Initially, six species from the Cape of Good Hope, in South Africa, were placed in the genus Bulbinella; three of them transferred from other genera and three of the species were described as new. In 1845, Joseph Dalton Hooker based his new genus Chrysobactron on B. rossii specimens collected from Campbell Island. B. rossii was first published in the Flora Antarctica by him, noting that Chrysobactron was "very nearly allied" and was similar to the South African Bulbinella genus, but he decided not to move the new genus into it. B. hookeri was first described by Hooker and William Colenso in 1852, and placed it in the genus Chrysobactron. In 1906, New Zealand botanist Thomas Cheeseman had doubted numerous times about the generic status of the New Zealand species and placed them in Bulbinella rather than in Chrysobactron.

In 1952, Lucy Cranwell studied the pollination of various New Zealand plant species; in her study, she mentioned the points of similarity between the grains of South African Bulbinella species and New Zealand Chrysobactron (now known as Bulbinella) species, but no other differences were mentioned by her. There are twenty-three species in the genus Bulbinella; seventeen of which are located in South Africa, and six in New Zealand.

=== Etymology ===
The etymology (word origin) of B. hookeri's genus name, Bulbinella, derives from the Greek βολβός, simply meaning 'bulb' (an underground plant storage structure). Both words Bulbine and Bulbinella translate to English as 'little bulb'. The specific epithet (second part of the scientific name), hookeri, is named in honour of Hooker, who first described the species with Colenso. The species is commonly known as the Māori lily. In the Māori language, the species is known as riki and waoriki.

== Distribution ==
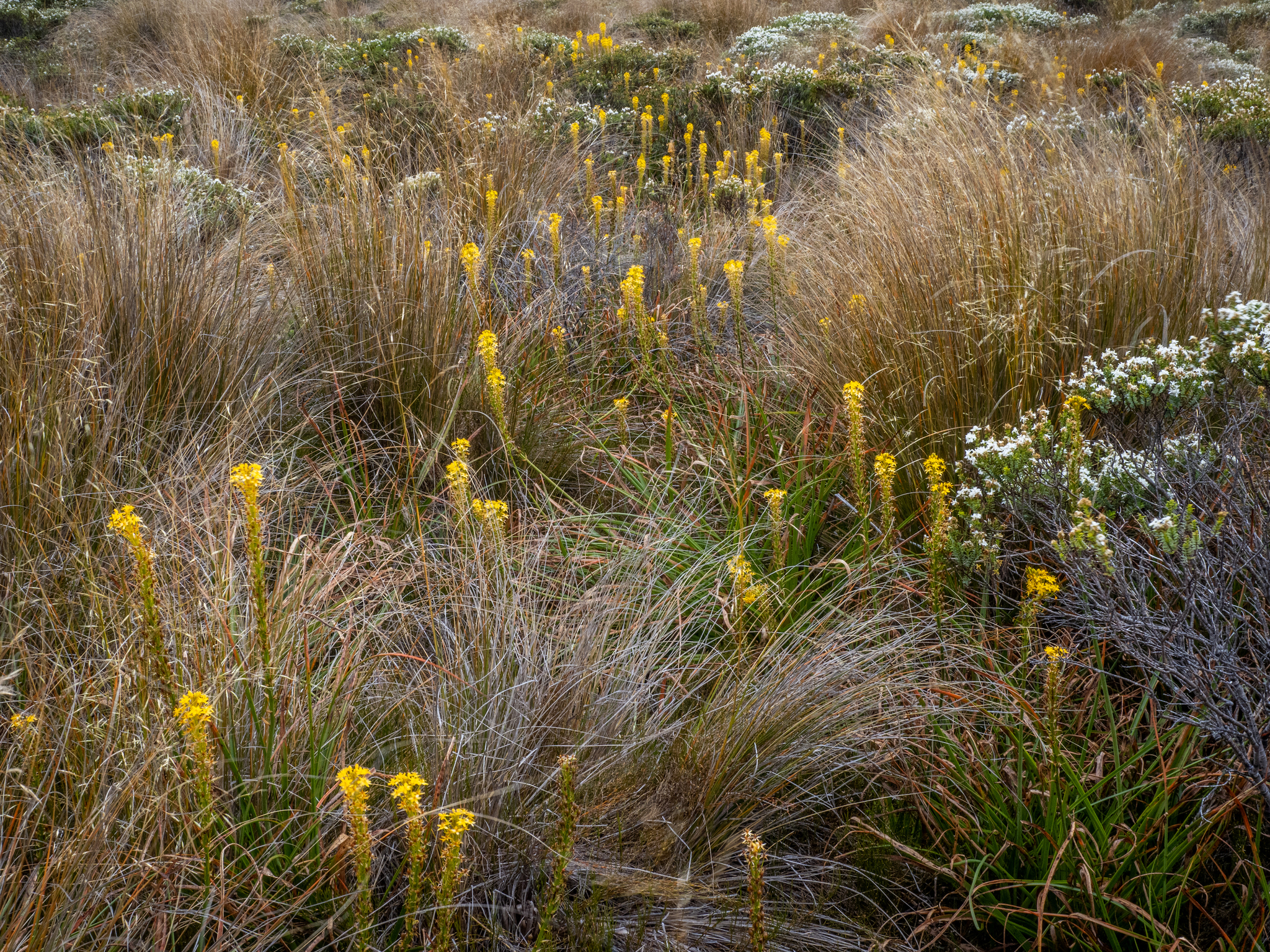
B. hookeri in its natural habitat, in a boggy tussock grassland.

Bulbinella hookeri is endemic to New Zealand; its range covers the North, South, and Stewart Islands. In the North Island, it occurs on Mount Taranaki, Maungapōhatu, and partly in the north-western part of the Ruahine Range. In the South Island, it occurs in Canterbury Region, Marlborough Region, Nelson, and as far west as Cobb Valley. B. hookeri's northern limits are Lake Taupō and Mount Taranaki, and its southern limit is approximately the Waiau Uwha River in Canterbury. B. hookeri's 2023 assessment in the New Zealand Threat Classification System was "Not Threatened".

=== Habitat ===
New Zealand's Bulbinella species prefer colder habitats and soils with high water content. B. hookeri typically occurs in mountainous areas, but it is still common in areas 150 m (500 ft) above sea level. It is commonly found in boggy areas, shaded slopes, seepages, valleys with high rainfall, and other wet places. B. hookeri principally occurs in tussock grasslands. It prefers areas with sun or partial shade.

== Ecology ==
A 2018 study of the native bee, Lasioglossum sordidum, foraging in the Christchurch Botanic Gardens, reported that B. hookeri was occasionally visited by the species. B. hookeri is likely pollinated by insects, such as bees and flies, and its seeds are later dispersed by the wind.

== Works cited ==
Books

- Cheeseman, T. F. (1906). Manual of the New Zealand flora (1 ed.). Wellington, New Zealand: New Zealand Board of Science and Art – via the Internet Archive.
- Clausen, Ruth Rogers; Christopher, Thomas (2015). Essential Perennials: The Complete Reference to 2700 Perennials for the Home Garden. Timber Press. ISBN 1-60469-316-9.
- Colenso, William; Hooker, Joseph Dalton (1871). Icones plantarum or figures, with brief descriptive characters and remarks, of new or rare plants, selected from the author's herbarium. Vol. 9. Longman, Rees, Orme, Brown, Green, & Longman, etc.
- Cranwell, Lucy May (1952). New Zealand pollen studies: the monocotyledons: a comparative account. Auckland, New Zealand: Harvard University Press – via the Internet Archive.
- Gledhill, David (6 March 2008). The Names of Plants. Cambridge, United Kingdom: Cambridge University Press. ISBN 978-0-521-68553-5.
- Fitter, Julian (2022). Field Guide to the Wildlife of New Zealand. London, United Kingdom: Bloomsbury Publishing. ISBN 978-1-4729-8126-4.
- Hooker, Joseph Dalton (1859). The Botany of the Antarctic Voyage of H.M. Discovery Ships Erebus and Terror in the years 1839–1843, under the Command of Captain Sir James Clark Ross. London, United Kingdom: Reeve Brothers – via the Internet Archive.
- Perry, Pauline L. (1999). Bulbinella in South Africa. Pretoria, South Africa: National Botanical Institute. ISBN 1-919795-46-4 – via the Internet Archive.

Journals

- Bennet, Della G.; Kelly, Dave; Clemens, John (2018). "Food plants and foraging distances for the native bee Lasioglossum sordidum in Christchurch Botanic Gardens". New Zealand Journal of Ecology. 42 (1). New Zealand Ecological Society: 40–47. ISSN 0110-6465. JSTOR 26538094.
- Butz Huryn, Vivian M. (1995). "Use of native New Zealand plants by honey bees (Apis mellifera L.): A review". New Zealand Journal of Botany. 33 (4): 497–512. doi:10.1080/0028825X.1995.10410621. ISSN 0028-825X.
- Moore, L. B. (1964). "The New Zealand Species of Bulbinella (Liliaceae)". New Zealand Journal of Botany. 2 (3): 286–304. doi:10.1080/0028825X.1964.10443948. ISSN 0028-825X.
- Musara, Collen; Spies, Paula; Spies, Johanne J.; Stedje, Brita (9 July 2017). "A review of Bulbinella (Asphodelaceae): distribution, conservation status, and economic importance". Botanical Sciences. 95 (2): 155–168. doi:10.17129/botsci.696. ISSN 2007-4476.
- Perry, P.L. (1987). "A synoptic review of the genus Bulbinella (Asphodelaceae) in South Africa". South African Journal of Botany. 53 (6): 431–444. doi:10.1016/S0254-6299(16)31377-1. ISSN 0254-6299.
- Richardson, Alistair T.B.; Lord, Janice M.; Perry, Nigel B. (2017). "Phenylanthraquinones and flavone-C-glucosides from the disjunct Bulbinella in New Zealand". Phytochemistry. 134: 64–70. doi:10.1016/j.phytochem.2016.11.014. ISSN 0031-9422.

Miscellaneous

- De Lange, Peter J.; Gosden, Jane; Courtney, Shannel; Fergus, Alexander Jon; Barkla, John W.; Beadel, S. M.; Champion, Paul D.; Hindmarsh-Walls, Rowan; Makan, Troy; Michel, Pascale (29 October 2024). "Conservation status of vascular plants in Aotearoa New Zealand, 2023" (PDF). Department of Conservation. ISSN 2324-1713. Archived (PDF) from the original on 10 February 2025.
- "Bulbinella hookeri". New Zealand Plant Conservation Network. 2025. Archived from the original on 20 April 2025.
