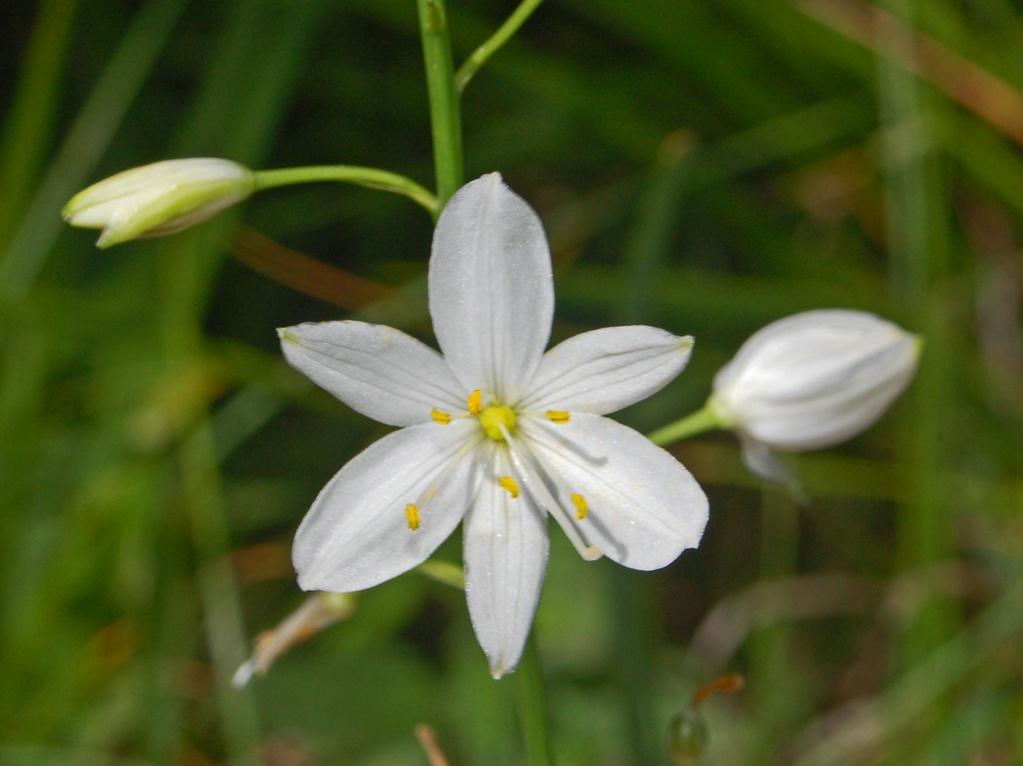
- Flower of Anthericum ramosum

Scientific classification
- Kingdom: Plantae
- Clade: Tracheophytes
- Clade: Angiosperms
- Clade: Monocots
- Order: Asparagales
- Family: Asparagaceae
- Subfamily: Agavoideae
- Genus: Anthericum
- Species: A. ramosum

Binomial name
- Anthericum ramosum L.

Synonyms
- Phalangites ramosus (L.) Bubani

= Anthericum ramosum =

Species of flowering plant

Anthericum ramosum, known as branched St Bernard's-lily, is a herbaceous perennial plant with a rhizome. The genus Anthericum is currently placed in the family Asparagaceae, subfamily Agavoideae. It was formerly placed in its own family, Anthericaceae, and before that in the Liliaceae.

== Description ==
Anthericum ramosum reaches on average a height of 30–70 centimetres (12–28 in). The grass-like leaves are 50 centimetres (20 in) long and 2–6 millimetres (0.08–0.2 in) wide and are generally much shorter than the inflorescence. It has an erect, paniculate inflorescence. The flower spikes are branched (hence the Latin name ramosus), unlike Anthericum liliago. The six tepals are white, 10–13 millimetres (0.4–0.5 in) long, as are the six stamens. The flower is scentless and pure white, the anthers are bright yellow. The flowering period extends from June through August. The capsular fruit is spherical to three-faced. The flowers are pollinated by hymenopterans, while seed are distributed by the wind.

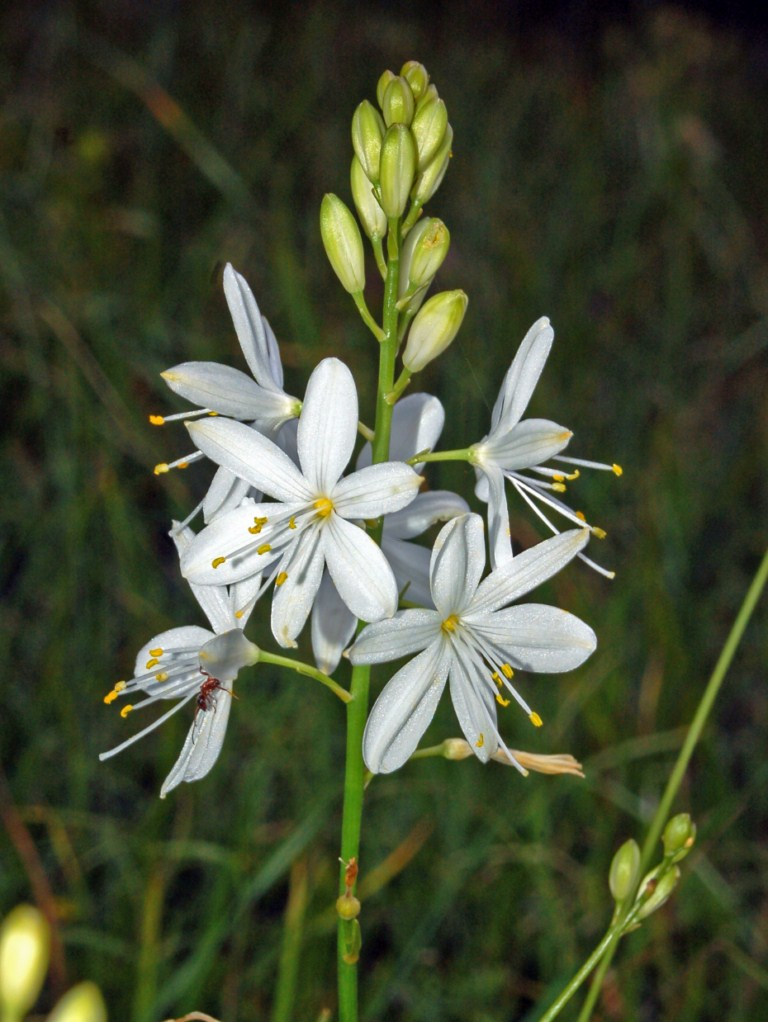
Inflorescence of Anthericum ramosum

== Distribution ==
This species is present in most of Europe, being more common in southern countries, and is widespread in Central Asia and Russia.

== Habitat ==
These plants grow in sunny areas and calcareous soils, on semiarid grasslands, slopes and forest edges. In the Alps, they can be found at an altitude of 0–1,600 metres (0–5,249 ft) above sea level.
