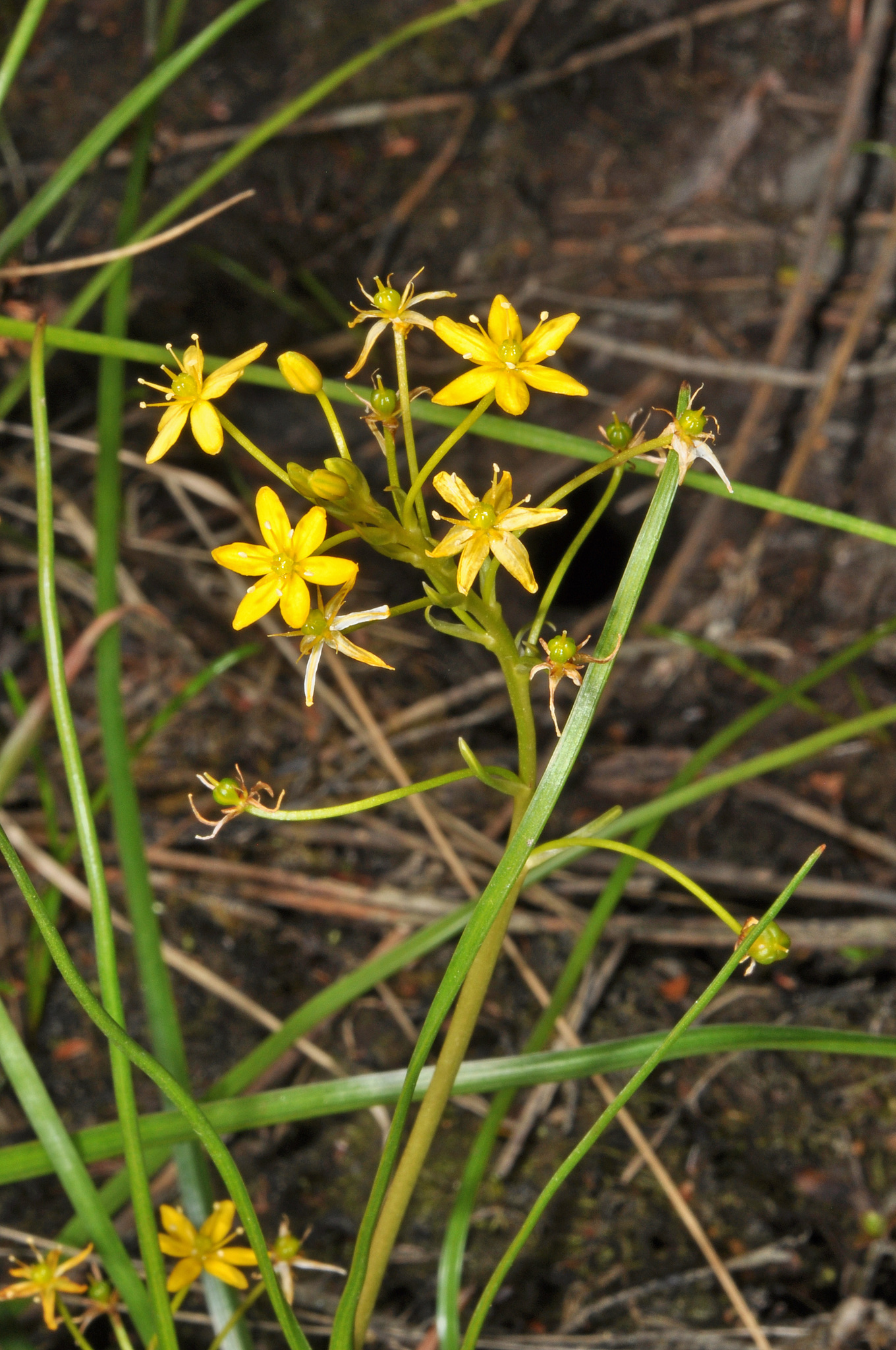
- Bulbinella modesta

Conservation status
- Naturally Uncommon (NZ TCS)

Scientific classification
- Kingdom: Plantae
- Clade: Tracheophytes
- Clade: Angiosperms
- Clade: Monocots
- Order: Asparagales
- Family: Asphodelaceae
- Subfamily: Asphodeloideae
- Genus: Bulbinella
- Species: B. modesta

Binomial name
- Bulbinella modesta (L.B.Moore)

= Bulbinella modesta =

Species of flowering plant

Bulbinella modesta is a species of flowering plant in the family Asphodelaceae. It is endemic to the South Island of New Zealand, only found in the West Coast Region in damp lowland areas. It is a slender plant reaching 300 mm in height. B. modesta was first described in 1964 by the New Zealand botanist Lucy Moore. It gets its specific epithet, modesta, in reference to "the modest dimensions of the plant" compared to other species it had previously been placed in.

== Description ==
Bulbinella modesta is a species of perennial herb in the family Asphodelaceae and the subfamily Asphodeloideae. It is very slender, reaching 300 mm in height. Its roots are swollen and are fusiform in character. Its leaves are bright-green in colour, less than 10 mm wide, and linear in character. Its inflorescences (flower clusters) are short. Its flowers are star-like in character, yellow-coloured, with 9.5–13 mm long perianths. Its bracteoles are short. Its pedicels are long and spreading. Its capsules are globe-shaped and 4.5–5 mm in diameter. Its seeds are brown in colour and 3.5–4 mm long.

== Taxonomy ==
The Bulbinella genus was first established in 1843 by Carl Sigismund Kunth. Initially, six species from the Cape of Good Hope, in South Africa, were placed in the genus Bulbinella; three of them transferred from other genera and three of the species were described as new. In 1845, Joseph Dalton Hooker based his new genus Chrysobactron on B. rossii specimens collected from Campbell Island. B. rossii was first published in the Flora Antarctica by him, noting that Chrysobactron was "very nearly allied" and was similar to the South African Bulbinella genus, but he decided not to move the new genus into it. In 1906, botanist Thomas Cheeseman had doubted numerous times about the generic status of the New Zealand species and placed them in Bulbinella rather than in Chrysobactron. B. modesta was first described in 1964 by the New Zealand botanist Lucy Moore in her revision of New Zealand's Bulbinella species.

In 1952, Lucy Cranwell studied the pollination of various New Zealand plant species; in her study, she mentioned the points of similarity between the grains of South African Bulbinella species and New Zealand Chrysobactron (now known as Bulbinella) species, but no other differences were mentioned by her. There are twenty-three species in the genus Bulbinella; seventeen of which are located in South Africa, and six in New Zealand. B. modesta is closely allied to B. hookeri, but differs due to its thinner leaves and growth habitat.

=== Etymology ===
The etymology (word origin) of B. modesta's genus name, Bulbinella, derives from the Greek βολβός, simply meaning 'bulb' (an underground plant storage structure). Both words Bulbine and Bulbinella translate to English as 'little bulb'. The specific epithet (second part of the scientific name), modesta, was chosen by Moore to denote "the modest dimensions of the plant" in comparrison with other species it had previously been placed in.

== Distribution ==
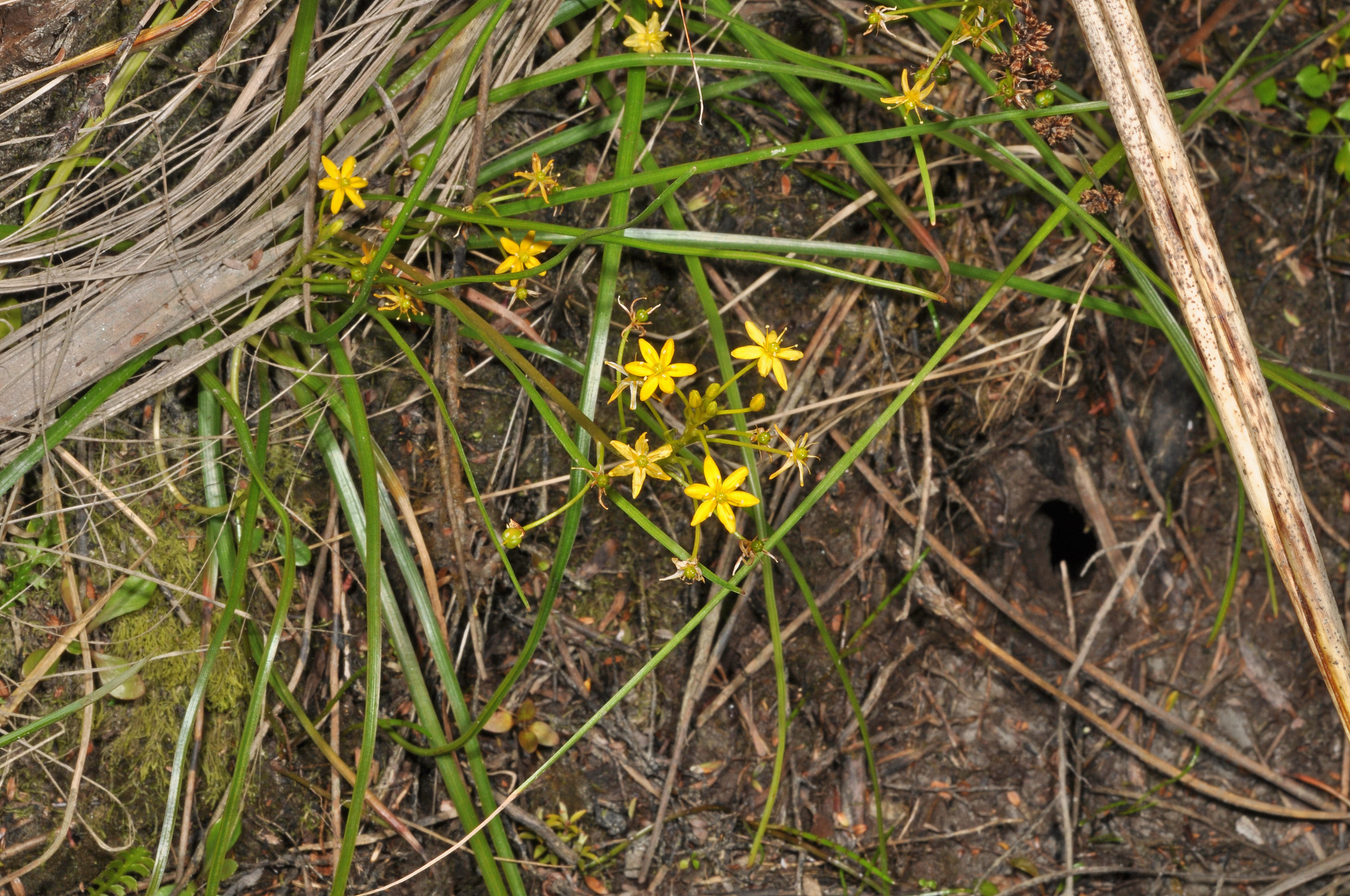
B. modesta in its natural habitat.

Bulbinella modesta is endemic to New Zealand. It is only found in the West Coast Region of the South Island, ranging from Westport in the Buller District to as far south as about Ōkārito. B. modesta's 2023 assessment in the New Zealand Threat Classification System was "At Risk — Naturally Uncommon".

=== Habitat ===
New Zealand's Bulbinella species prefer colder habitats and soils with high water content. B. modesta typically occurs in boglands, damp lowland areas, and near swamp associated forests. It commonly occurs 300 m (1,000 ft) above sea level. B. modesta is commonly associated with Austroderia richardii and Phormium tenax.

== Works cited ==
Books

- Cheeseman, T. F. (1906). Manual of the New Zealand flora (1 ed.). Wellington, New Zealand: New Zealand Board of Science and Art – via the Internet Archive.
- Cranwell, Lucy May (1952). New Zealand pollen studies: the monocotyledons: a comparative account. Auckland, New Zealand: Harvard University Press – via the Internet Archive.
- Gledhill, David (6 March 2008). The Names of Plants. Cambridge, United Kingdom: Cambridge University Press. ISBN 978-0-521-68553-5.
- Hooker, Joseph Dalton (1859). The Botany of the Antarctic Voyage of H.M. Discovery Ships Erebus and Terror in the years 1839–1843, under the Command of Captain Sir James Clark Ross. London, United Kingdom: Reeve Brothers – via the Internet Archive.
- Perry, Pauline L. (1999). Bulbinella in South Africa. Pretoria, South Africa: National Botanical Institute. ISBN 1-919795-46-4 – via the Internet Archive.

Journals

- Dickinson, K. J. M.; Mark, A. F. (1999). "Interpreting ecological patterns in an intact estuary, South‐west New Zealand World Heritage Area". Journal of Biogeography. 26 (4): 913–932. doi:10.1111/j.1365-2699.1999.00316.x. ISSN 0305-0270.
- Korner, Ch.; Farquhar, G. D.; Roksandic, Z. (1988). "A Global Survey of Carbon Isotope Discrimination in Plants from High Altitude". Oecologia. 74 (4). Springer: 623–632. ISSN 0029-8549. JSTOR 4218519.
- Moore, L. B. (1964). "The New Zealand Species of Bulbinella (Liliaceae)". New Zealand Journal of Botany. 2 (3): 286–304. doi:10.1080/0028825X.1964.10443948. ISSN 0028-825X.
- Musara, Collen; Spies, Paula; Spies, Johanne J.; Stedje, Brita (9 July 2017). "A review of Bulbinella (Asphodelaceae): distribution, conservation status, and economic importance". Botanical Sciences. 95 (2): 155–168. doi:10.17129/botsci.696. ISSN 2007-4476.
- Perry, P.L. (1987). "A synoptic review of the genus Bulbinella (Asphodelaceae) in South Africa". South African Journal of Botany. 53 (6): 431–444. doi:10.1016/S0254-6299(16)31377-1. ISSN 0254-6299.
- Wehi, Priscilla M.; Clarkson, Bruce D. (2007). "Biological flora of New Zealand 10. Phormium tenax, harakeke, New Zealand flax". New Zealand Journal of Botany. 45 (4): 521–544. doi:10.1080/00288250709509737. ISSN 0028-825X.

Miscellaneous

- De Lange, Peter J.; Gosden, Jane; Courtney, Shannel; Fergus, Alexander Jon; Barkla, John W.; Beadel, S. M.; Champion, Paul D.; Hindmarsh-Walls, Rowan; Makan, Troy; Michel, Pascale (29 October 2024). "Conservation status of vascular plants in Aotearoa New Zealand, 2023" (PDF). Department of Conservation. ISSN 2324-1713. Archived (PDF) from the original on 10 February 2025.
- "Bulbinella modesta". New Zealand Plant Conservation Network. 2025. Archived from the original on 23 March 2025.
