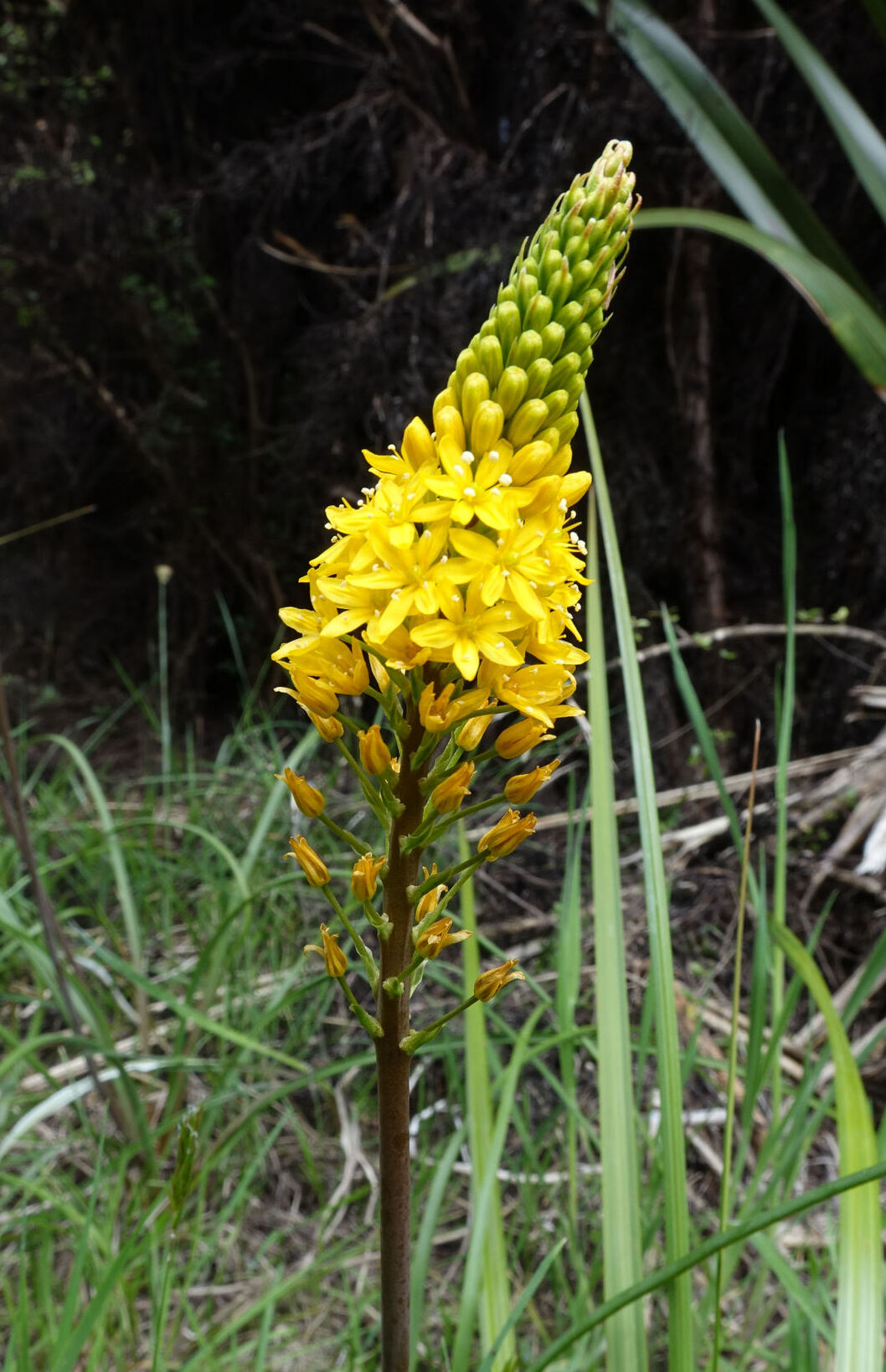
- Bulbinella angustifolia

Conservation status
- Not Threatened (NZ TCS)

Scientific classification
- Kingdom: Plantae
- Clade: Tracheophytes
- Clade: Angiosperms
- Clade: Monocots
- Order: Asparagales
- Family: Asphodelaceae
- Subfamily: Asphodeloideae
- Genus: Bulbinella
- Species: B. angustifolia

Binomial name
- Bulbinella angustifolia (L.B.Moore)

= Bulbinella angustifolia =

Species of flowering plant

Bulbinella angustifolia, commonly known as the Māori onion, is a species of flowering plant in the family Asphodelaceae. It is endemic to the South Island of New Zealand, mostly found in Canterbury and Otago. It is commonly found in tussock grasslands in areas with moderate moisture contents. B. angustifolia reaches a height of up to 100 cm (40 in) tall. B. angustifolia was first described in 1911 by the New Zealand botanist Leonard Cockayne. It gets its specific epithet, angustifolia, derived from the Latin angustus and folius, meaning 'narrow-leaved'.

== Description ==
Bulbinella angustifolia is a species of perennial herb in the family Asphodelaceae and the subfamily Asphodeloideae. It reaches 100 cm (40 in) in height. Its leaves are usually smooth and narrow to a tip, the longest and widest leaves were measured at 60 cm (20 in) long and 15 cm (6 in), respectively. B. angustifolia's perianths are small, and the flowers are yellow in colour. Its peduncles are 5–55 mm × 1–10 mm long, the racemes are 2.5–20 × 1.5–2.5 cm long, its pedicels are usually about 15 mm long, but can be 20 mm long. Its capsules are 5–7 × 4 mm long. Its infructescences (fruit clusters) are usually arranged above the leaves. Its seeds are approximately 4–4.5 mm long.

== Taxonomy ==
The Bulbinella genus was first established in 1843 by Carl Sigismund Kunth. Initially, six species from the Cape of Good Hope, in South Africa, were placed in the genus Bulbinella; three of them transferred from other genera and three of the species were described as new. In 1845, Joseph Dalton Hooker based his new genus Chrysobactron on B. rossii specimens collected from Campbell Island. B. rossii was first published in the Flora Antarctica by him, noting that Chrysobactron was "very nearly allied" and was similar to the South African Bulbinella genus, but he decided not to move the new genus into it. In 1906, botanist Thomas Cheeseman had doubted numerous times about the generic status of the New Zealand species and placed them in Bulbinella rather than in Chrysobactron. B. angustifolia was first described in 1911 by the New Zealand botanist Leonard Cockayne in the Transactions and Proceedings of the New Zealand Institute.

In 1952, Lucy Cranwell studied the pollination of various New Zealand plant species; in her study, she mentioned the points of similarity between the grains of South African Bulbinella species and New Zealand Chrysobactron (now known as Bulbinella) species, but no other differences were mentioned by her. There are twenty-three species in the genus Bulbinella; seventeen of which are located in South Africa, and six in New Zealand.

=== Etymology ===
The etymology (word origin) of B. angustifolia's genus name, Bulbinella, derives from the Greek βολβός, simply meaning 'bulb' (an underground plant storage structure). Both words Bulbine and Bulbinella translate to English as 'little bulb'. The specific epithet (second part of the scientific name), angustifolia, derives from the Latin angustus meaning 'constricted' or 'narrow', and folius meaning 'leaf', together meaning narrow-leaved. It is commonly known as the Māori onion.

== Distribution ==
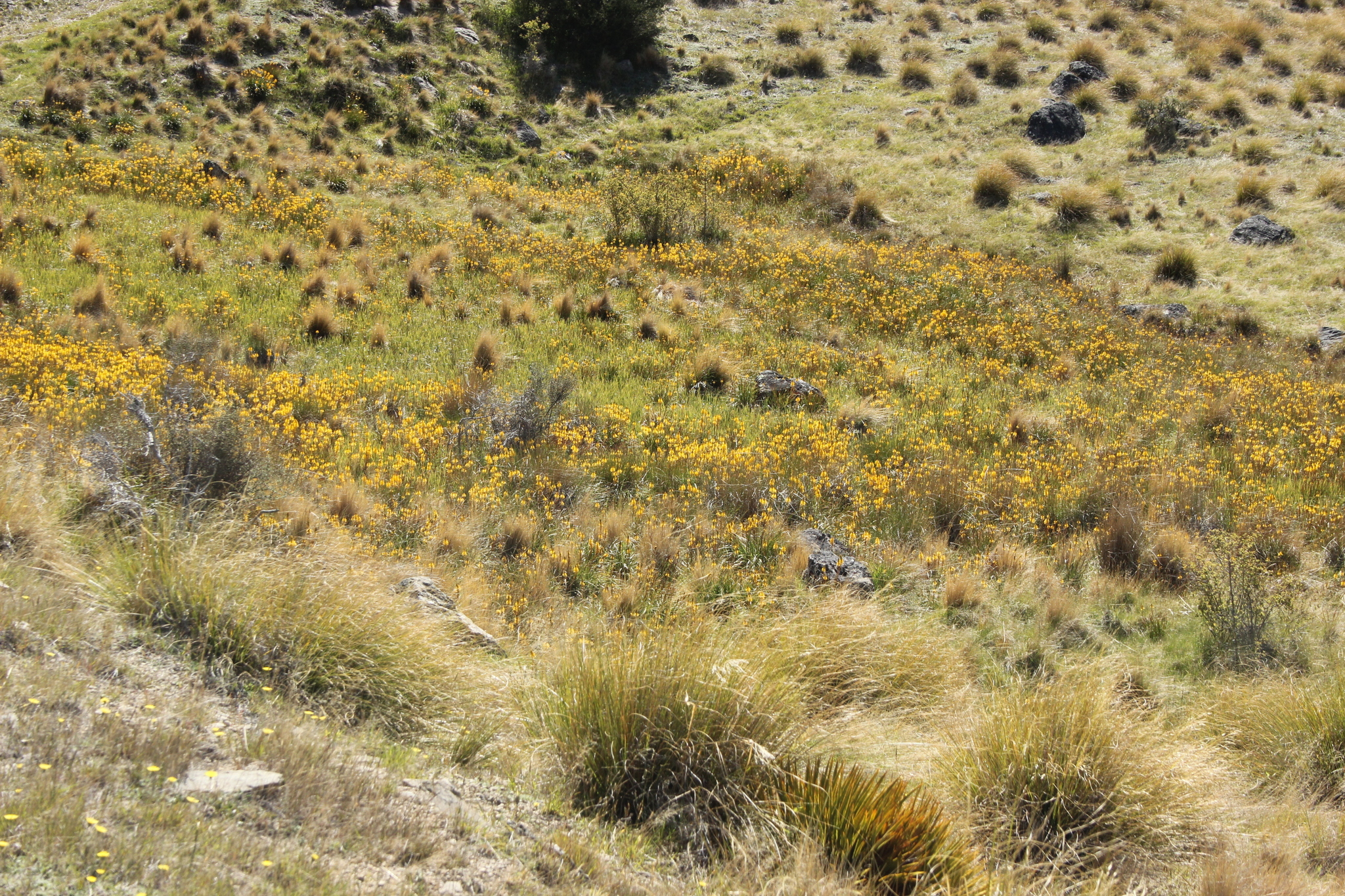
B. angustifolia in its natural habitat

Bulbinella angustifolia is endemic to the South Island of New Zealand, ranging from approximately the Hurunui River, in the Canterbury Region, southwards through the Canterbury Plains, Otago, and the Southland Region. It is not found west of the Southern Alps. B. angustifolia's 2023 assessment in the New Zealand Threat Classification System was "Not Threatened".

=== Habitat ===
New Zealand's Bulbinella species prefer colder habitats and soils with high water content. B. angustifolia is typically found in damp environments such as boglands, seepages, and steep shaded slopes, predominantly in tussock grasslands where it is often locally abundant. It is common in areas with a moderate moisture status, and it commonly coincides with Chionochloa rubra.

== Ecology ==
A 1996 study reported B. angustifolia was grazed by rabbits (Oryctolagus cuniculus), although in low quantities when compared to other species at the studied site in Central Otago. B. angustifolia is likely pollinated by insects, such as bees and flies, and its seeds are later dispersed by the wind.

== Works cited ==
Books

- Cheeseman, T. F. (1906). Manual of the New Zealand flora (1 ed.). Wellington, New Zealand: New Zealand Board of Science and Art – via the Internet Archive.
- Cranwell, Lucy May (1952). New Zealand pollen studies: the monocotyledons: a comparative account. Auckland, New Zealand: Harvard University Press – via the Internet Archive.
- Gledhill, David (6 March 2008). The Names of Plants. Cambridge, United Kingdom: Cambridge University Press. ISBN 978-0-521-68553-5.
- Hooker, Joseph Dalton (1859). The Botany of the Antarctic Voyage of H.M. Discovery Ships Erebus and Terror in the years 1839–1843, under the Command of Captain Sir James Clark Ross. London, United Kingdom: Reeve Brothers – via the Internet Archive.
- Perry, Pauline L. (1999). Bulbinella in South Africa. Pretoria, South Africa: National Botanical Institute. ISBN 1-919795-46-4 – via the Internet Archive.

Journals

- Cockayne, Leonard (1 July 1911). "Transactions and Proceedings of the New Zealand Institute". Transactions and Proceedings of the Royal Society of New Zealand. 43 (1) – via Biodiversity Heritage Library.
- Daly, G. T. (1967). "Ordination of grassland and related communities in Otago". Proceedings (New Zealand Ecological Society) (14). New Zealand Ecological Society: 63–70. ISSN 0077-9946. JSTOR 24061279.
- Norbury, D.C.; Norbury, G. L. (1996). "Short-term Effects of Rabbit Grazing on a Degraded Short-tussock Grassland in Central Otago". New Zealand Journal of Ecology. 20 (2). New Zealand Ecological Society: 285–288. ISSN 0110-6465. JSTOR 24054479.
- Moore, L. B. (1964). "The New Zealand Species of Bulbinella (Liliaceae)". New Zealand Journal of Botany. 2 (3): 286–304. doi:10.1080/0028825X.1964.10443948. ISSN 0028-825X.
- Musara, Collen; Spies, Paula; Spies, Johanne J.; Stedje, Brita (9 July 2017). "A review of Bulbinella (Asphodelaceae): distribution, conservation status, and economic importance". Botanical Sciences. 95 (2): 155–168. doi:10.17129/botsci.696. ISSN 2007-4476.
- Perry, P.L. (1987). "A synoptic review of the genus Bulbinella (Asphodelaceae) in South Africa". South African Journal of Botany. 53 (6): 431–444. doi:10.1016/S0254-6299(16)31377-1. ISSN 0254-6299.

Miscellaneous

- De Lange, Peter J.; Gosden, Jane; Courtney, Shannel; Fergus, Alexander Jon; Barkla, John W.; Beadel, S. M.; Champion, Paul D.; Hindmarsh-Walls, Rowan; Makan, Troy; Michel, Pascale (29 October 2024). "Conservation status of vascular plants in Aotearoa New Zealand, 2023" (PDF). Department of Conservation. ISSN 2324-1713. Archived (PDF) from the original on 10 February 2025.
- "Bulbinella angustifolia". New Zealand Plant Conservation Network. 2025. Archived from the original on 17 May 2025.
