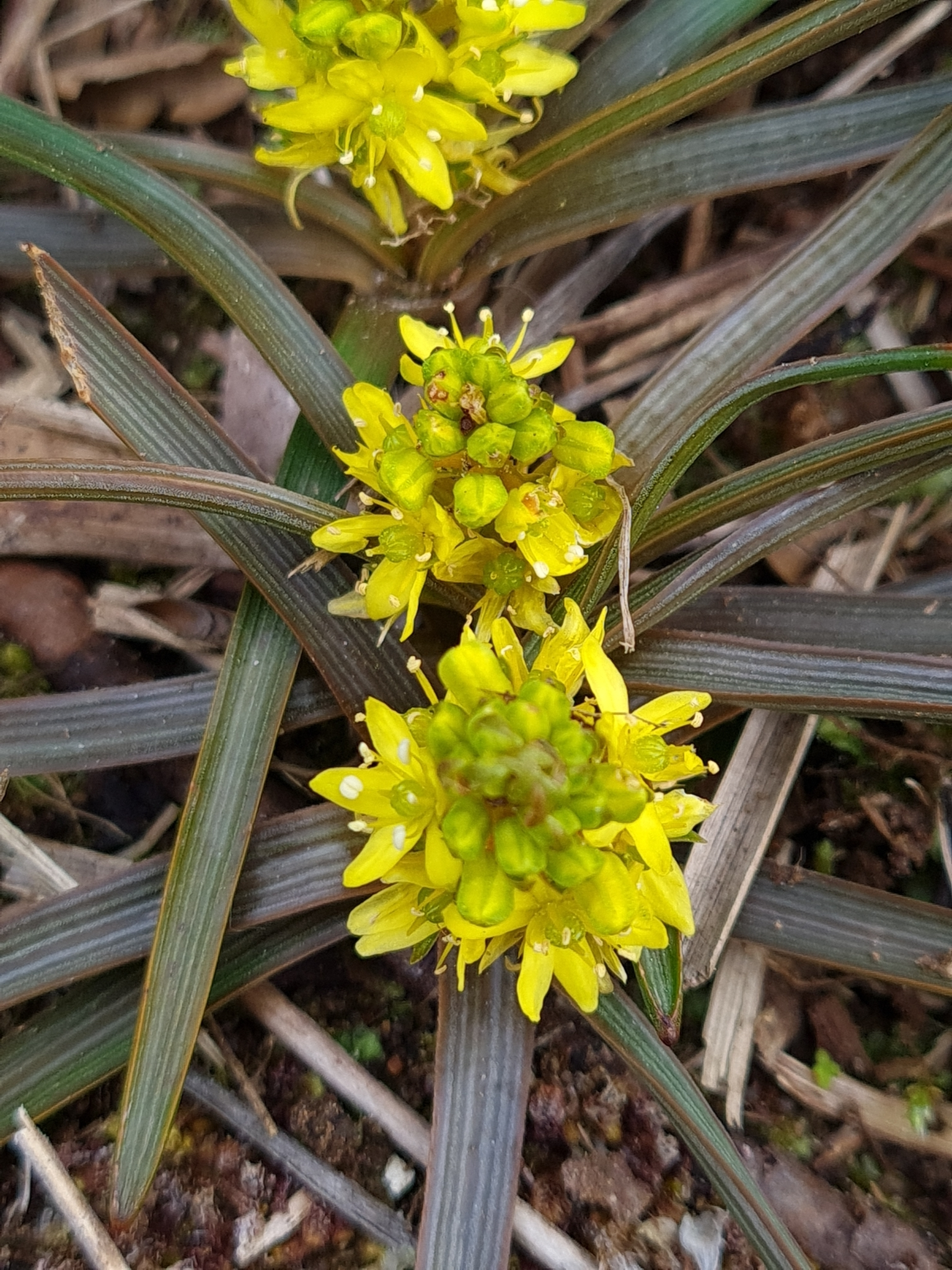

Conservation status
- Naturally Uncommon (NZ TCS)

Scientific classification
- Kingdom: Plantae
- Clade: Embryophytes
- Clade: Tracheophytes
- Clade: Angiosperms
- Clade: Monocots
- Order: Asparagales
- Family: Asphodelaceae
- Subfamily: Asphodeloideae
- Genus: Bulbinella
- Species: B. talbotii

Binomial name
- Bulbinella talbotii L.B.Moore

= Bulbinella talbotii =

Species of flowering plant

Bulbinella talbotii, commonly known as the Gouland Downs's onion and Talbot's onion, is a species of flowering plant in the family Asphodelaceae. It is endemic to the South Island of New Zealand; only known to be found in the Gouland Downs, where it is commonly found in boggy areas. B. talbotii was first described in 1964 by the botanist Lucy Moore. It gets its specific epithet, talbotii, after Harry Talbot, who assisted Moore in discovering the species.

== Description ==
Bulbinella hookeri is a species of perennial herb in the family Asphodelaceae and the subfamily Asphodeloideae. It reaches up to 100–400 mm in height. Its roots are fusiform in character. Its leaves are 3–7 mm wide. Its peduncles and pedicels are very short. Its racemes are 10–25 × 15 mm long. Its flowers are yellow in colour, but the tips of the tepals are green in colour. Its perianths are 7–11 mm in diameter. Its capsules are 3.5–6.5 mm in diameter. Its seeds are 3.5 mm long.

== Taxonomy ==
The Bulbinella genus was first established in 1843 by Carl Sigismund Kunth. Initially, six species from the Cape of Good Hope, in South Africa, were placed in the genus Bulbinella; three of them transferred from other genera and three of the species were described as new. In 1845, Joseph Dalton Hooker based his new genus Chrysobactron on B. rossii specimens collected from Campbell Island. B. rossii was first published in the Flora Antarctica by him, noting that Chrysobactron was "very nearly allied" and was similar to the South African Bulbinella genus, but he decided not to move the new genus into it. In 1906, New Zealand botanist Thomas Cheeseman had doubted numerous times about the generic status of the New Zealand species and placed them in Bulbinella rather than in Chrysobactron. B. tallbotii was first described in 1964 by the New Zealand botanist Lucy Moore in her revision of New Zealand's Bulbinella species. Harry Talbot and Walter Boa Brockie assisted her in describing and collecting the species.

In 1952, Lucy Cranwell studied the pollination of various New Zealand plant species; in her study, she mentioned the points of similarity between the grains of South African Bulbinella species and New Zealand Chrysobactron (now known as Bulbinella) species, but no other differences were mentioned by her. There are twenty-three species in the genus Bulbinella; seventeen of which are located in South Africa, and six in New Zealand.

=== Etymology ===
The etymology (word origin) of B. tallbotii's genus name, Bulbinella, derives from the Greek βολβός, simply meaning 'bulb' (an underground plant storage structure). Both words Bulbine and Bulbinella translate to English as 'little bulb'. The specific epithet (second part of the scientific name), talbotii, is named in honour of Talbot, who assisted in collecting this plant for Moore's 1964 revision of the genus. The species is commonly known as the Gouland Down's onion and Talbot's onion.

== Distribution ==
Bulbinella hookeri is endemic to the South Island of New Zealand. It is only known to be found in the Gouland Downs, which is north-west of Nelson. B. tallbotii's 2023 assessment in the New Zealand Threat Classification System was "Not Threatened".

=== Habitat ===
New Zealand's Bulbinella species prefer colder habitats and soils with high water content. B. tallbotii typically occurs in montane areas where the ground is boggy. The species can also occur near bodies of water in open shrublands.

== Works cited ==
Journals

- Cheeseman, T. F. (1906). Manual of the New Zealand flora (1 ed.). Wellington, New Zealand: New Zealand Board of Science and Art – via the Internet Archive.
- Cranwell, Lucy May (1952). New Zealand pollen studies: the monocotyledons: a comparative account. Auckland, New Zealand: Harvard University Press – via the Internet Archive.
- Gledhill, David (6 March 2008). The Names of Plants. Cambridge, United Kingdom: Cambridge University Press. ISBN 978-0-521-68553-5.
- Hooker, Joseph Dalton (1859). The Botany of the Antarctic Voyage of H.M. Discovery Ships Erebus and Terror in the years 1839–1843, under the Command of Captain Sir James Clark Ross. London, United Kingdom: Reeve Brothers – via the Internet Archive.
- Perry, Pauline L. (1999). Bulbinella in South Africa. Pretoria, South Africa: National Botanical Institute. ISBN 1-919795-46-4 – via the Internet Archive.

Journals

- Moore, L. B. (1964). "The New Zealand Species of Bulbinella (Liliaceae)". New Zealand Journal of Botany. 2 (3): 286–304. Bibcode:1964NZJB....2..286M. doi:10.1080/0028825X.1964.10443948. ISSN 0028-825X.
- Musara, Collen; Spies, Paula; Spies, Johanne J.; Stedje, Brita (9 July 2017). "A review of Bulbinella (Asphodelaceae): distribution, conservation status, and economic importance". Botanical Sciences. 95 (2): 155–168. Bibcode:2017BotSc..95..155M. doi:10.17129/botsci.696. ISSN 2007-4476.
- Perry, P.L. (1987). "A synoptic review of the genus Bulbinella (Asphodelaceae) in South Africa". South African Journal of Botany. 53 (6): 431–444. Bibcode:1987SAJB...53..431P. doi:10.1016/S0254-6299(16)31377-1. ISSN 0254-6299.
- Simpson, M. J. A. (1974). "Walter Boa Brockie, N.D.H.(N.Z.), F.R.I.H.(N.Z.) 1897–1972". New Zealand Journal of Botany. 12 (1): 149–156. Bibcode:1974NZJB...12..149S. doi:10.1080/0028825X.1974.10428631. ISSN 0028-825X.

Miscellaneous

- De Lange, Peter J.; Gosden, Jane; Courtney, Shannel; Fergus, Alexander Jon; Barkla, John W.; Beadel, S. M.; Champion, Paul D.; Hindmarsh-Walls, Rowan; Makan, Troy; Michel, Pascale (29 October 2024). "Conservation status of vascular plants in Aotearoa New Zealand, 2023" (PDF). Department of Conservation. ISSN 2324-1713. Archived (PDF) from the original on 10 February 2025.
- "Bulbinella tallbotii". New Zealand Plant Conservation Network. 2025. Archived from the original on 15 June 2025.
