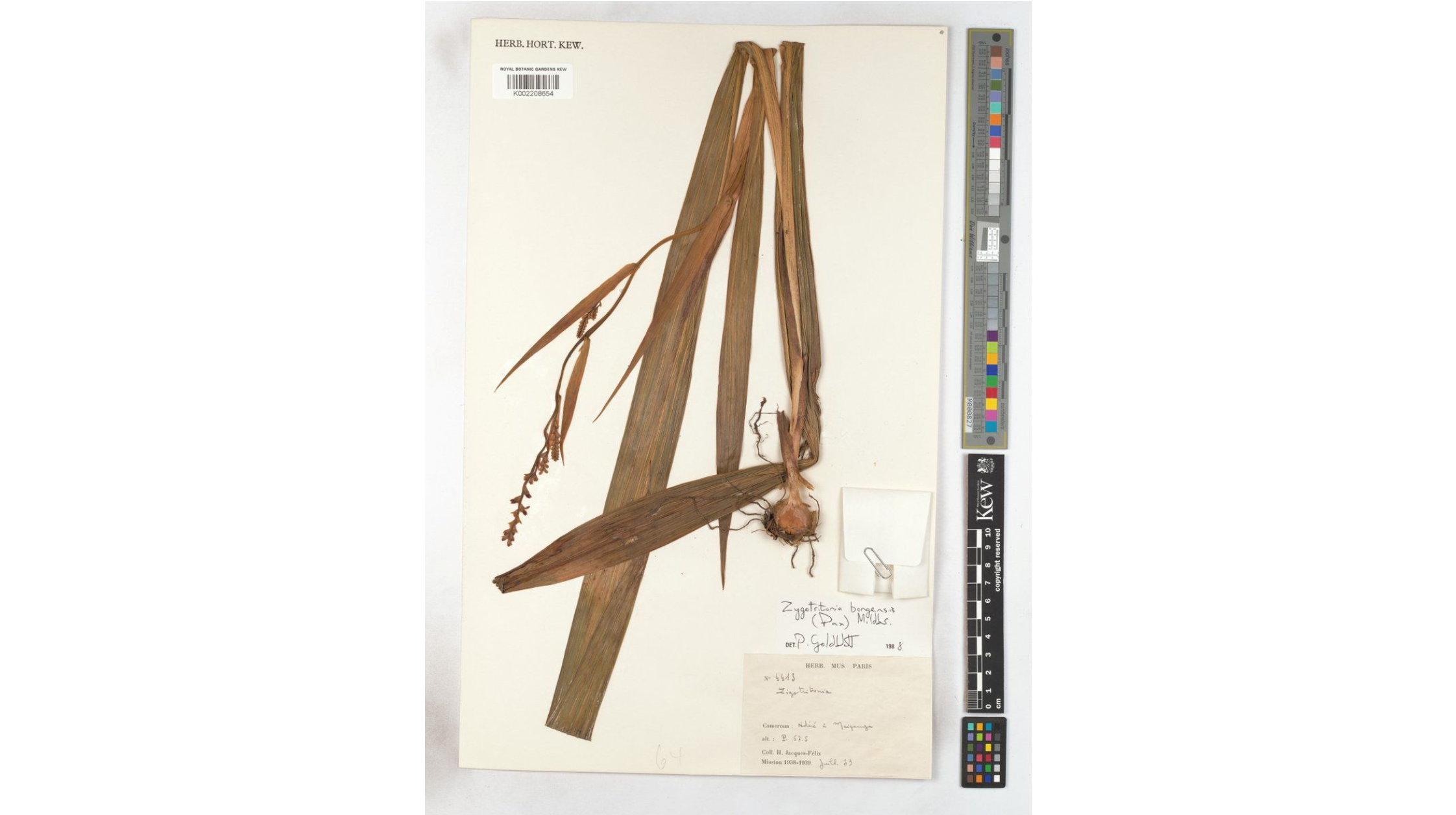

Scientific classification
- Kingdom: Plantae
- Clade: Tracheophytes
- Clade: Angiosperms
- Clade: Monocots
- Order: Asparagales
- Family: Iridaceae
- Genus: Zygotritonia
- Species: Z. bongensis

Binomial name
- Zygotritonia bongensis (Pax) Mildbr.

Synonyms
- Zygotritonia crocea Stapf

= Zygotritonia bongensis =

Species of plant

Zygotritonia bongensis is a perennial herb of the Iridaceae family. It is locally known as baka among the Yoruba people of Western Nigeria and it used by their traditional healers to treat diarrhea and dysentery. It is also considered a famine food as corms can be eaten during famine. Other names of the herb include Zygotritonia crocea (stapf).

== Morphology ==
Zygotritonia bongensis ranges from 18 - 65 cm tall. A perennial herb, it has underground stems like corms, 15-25 mm in diameter. One to three leaves, lanceolate, plicate with three to six major veins, the largest, usually the lowermost is between 15 - 40 mm wide, the uppermost is longest, ranges 5 - 12 cm long.

== Distribution ==
Native to West Tropical Africa, found in Nigeria, Ghana, Chad, Central African Republic, Benin and the Democratic Republic of Congo.
