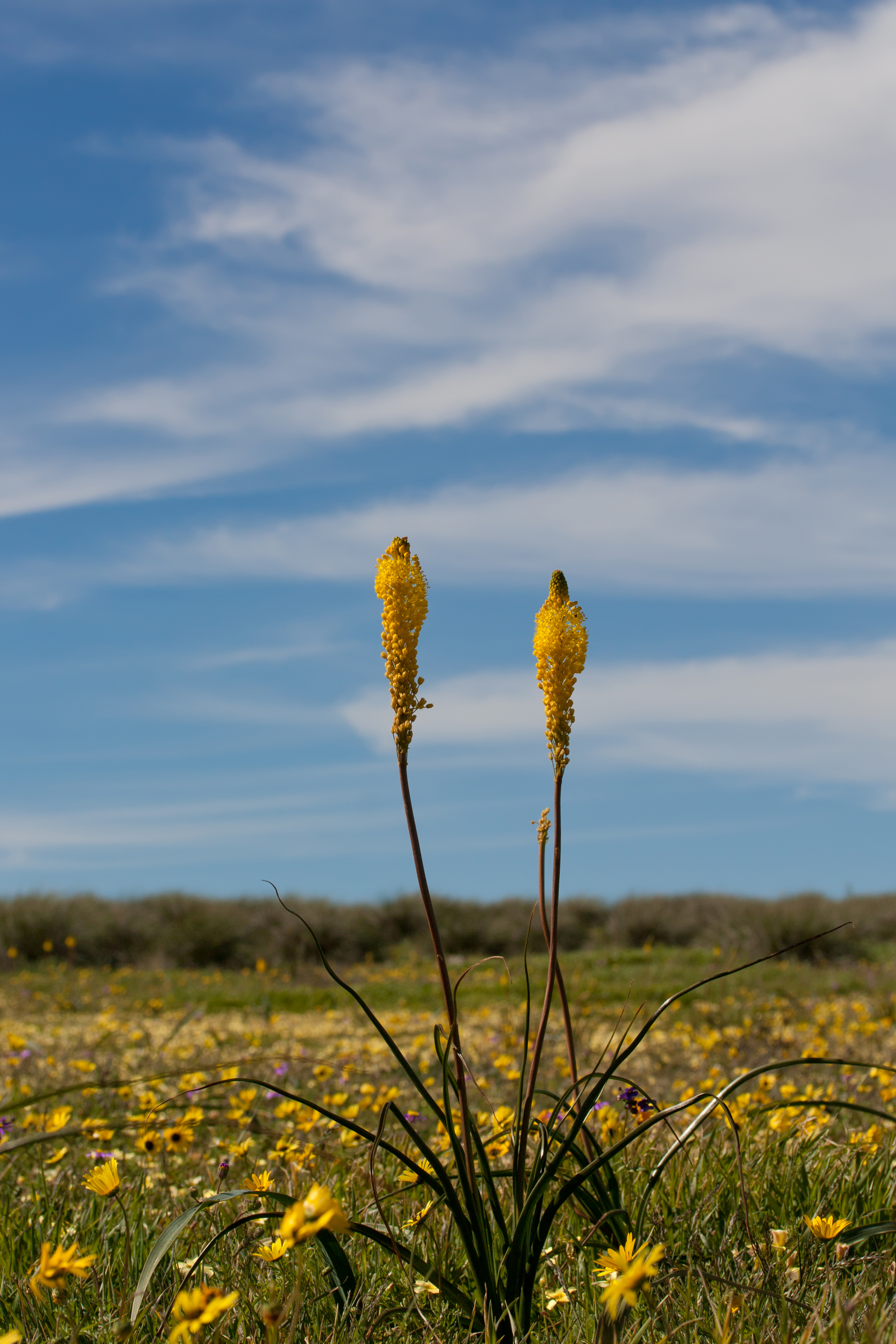
- Bulbinella elegans photographed in the Hantam National Botanical Garden, Nieuwoudtville, South Africa

Scientific classification
- Kingdom: Plantae
- Clade: Tracheophytes
- Clade: Angiosperms
- Clade: Monocots
- Order: Asparagales
- Family: Asphodelaceae
- Subfamily: Asphodeloideae
- Genus: Bulbinella
- Species: B. elegans

Binomial name
- Bulbinella elegans Schltr. ex P.L.Perry, 1987

= Bulbinella elegans =

Species of flowering plant

Bulbinella elegans is a species of flowering plant in the family Asphodelaceae. It is found in the Cape Province of South Africa.
