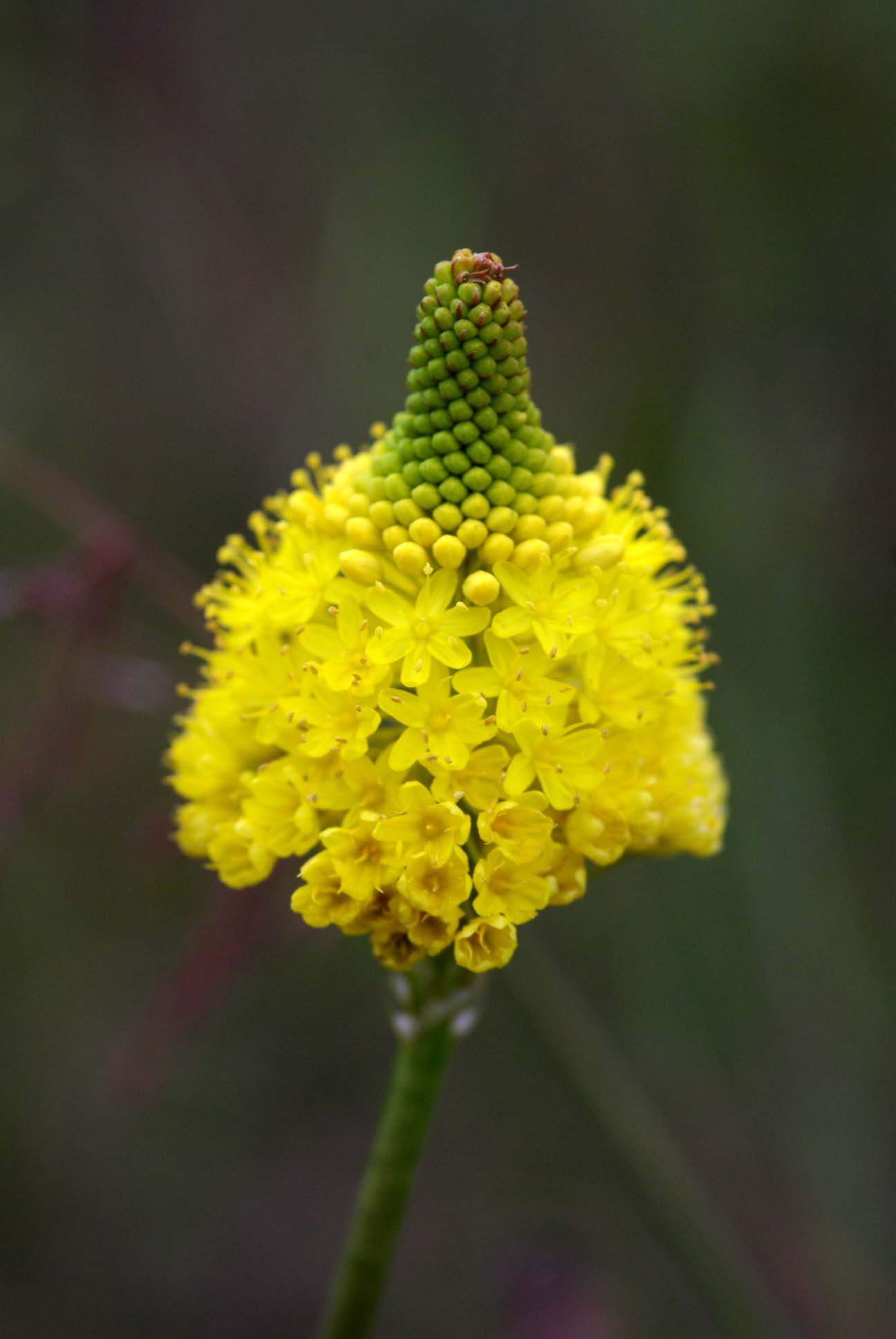
- Bulbinella triquetra

Scientific classification
- Kingdom: Plantae
- Clade: Embryophytes
- Clade: Tracheophytes
- Clade: Angiosperms
- Clade: Monocots
- Order: Asparagales
- Family: Asphodelaceae
- Subfamily: Asphodeloideae
- Genus: Bulbinella; Kunth

Synonyms
- Chrysobactron Hook.f.

= Bulbinella =

Genus of flowering plants

Bulbinella is a genus of plants in the family Asphodelaceae, subfamily Asphodeloideae, first described as a genus in 1843. Many species are endemic to Cape Province in western South Africa, confined to the winter rainfall area. Other species are endemic to New Zealand, where they are most common in the central Otago region which enjoys a similar climate to the Cape Region of South Africa.

== Description ==
They are characterised by the presence of a dense terminal raceme of flowers, often yellow but also white, pink, yellow or orange depending on the species. Each flower occurs in the axil of a bract and has 1 nerved perianth segments that are almost free. Each flower has 6 stamens. The seeds are characteristically shield shaped and there are one or two seeds in each chamber.

The plants may grow up to 1 metre (3 ft 3 in) in height and have narrow or thread like but never succulent leaves. The leaves decay into prominent fibres at the base of the stem, often netted or reticulate in appearance, although this feature is absent from the New Zealand species. They tend to overwinter and aestivate with wiry or swollen tubers.

Species

1. Bulbinella angustifolia (Cockayne & Laing) L.B.Moore – South Island of New Zealand
2. Bulbinella barkerae P.L.Perry – Caledon + Bredasdorp in Cape Province of South Africa
3. Bulbinella calcicola J.C.Manning & Goldblatt – Cape Province of South Africa
4. Bulbinella cauda-felis (L.f.) T.Durand & Schinz – Cape Province of South Africa
5. Bulbinella chartacea P.L.Perry – Clanwilliam + Worcester in Cape Province of South Africa
6. Bulbinella ciliolata Kunth – Namaqualand in Cape Province of South Africa
7. Bulbinella divaginata P.L.Perry – Cape Province of South Africa
8. Bulbinella eburniflora P.L.Perry – Calvinia in Cape Province of South Africa
9. Bulbinella elata P.L.Perry – Cape Province of South Africa
10. Bulbinella elegans Schltr. ex P.L.Perry – Cape Province of South Africa
11. Bulbinella floribunda (Aiton) T.Durand & Schinz – Yellow Cat-tail – Cape Province of South Africa
12. Bulbinella gibbsii Cockayne – North + South Islands of New Zealand
13. Bulbinella gracilis Kunth – Cape Province of South Africa
14. Bulbinella graminifolia P.L.Perry – Cape Province of South Africa
15. Bulbinella hookeri (Colenso ex Hook.) Cheeseman – Maori Lily – North + South Islands of New Zealand
16. Bulbinella latifolia Kunth – Cape Province of South Africa
17. Bulbinella modesta L.B.Moore – North + South Islands of New Zealand
18. Bulbinella nana P.L.Perry – Richtersveld in Cape Province of South Africa
19. Bulbinella nutans (Thunb.) T.Durand & Schinz – Cape Province of South Africa
20. Bulbinella potbergensis P.L.Perry – Cape Province of South Africa
21. Bulbinella punctulata Zahlbr. – Cape Province of South Africa
22. Bulbinella rossii (Hook.f.) Cheeseman – Ross Lily – Auckland Islands + Campbell Islands of New Zealand
23. Bulbinella talbotii L.B.Moore – Gouland Downs in New Zealand's South Island
24. Bulbinella trinervis (Baker) P.L.Perry – Cape Province of South Africa
25. Bulbinella triquetra (L.f.) Kunth – Cape Province of South Africa
