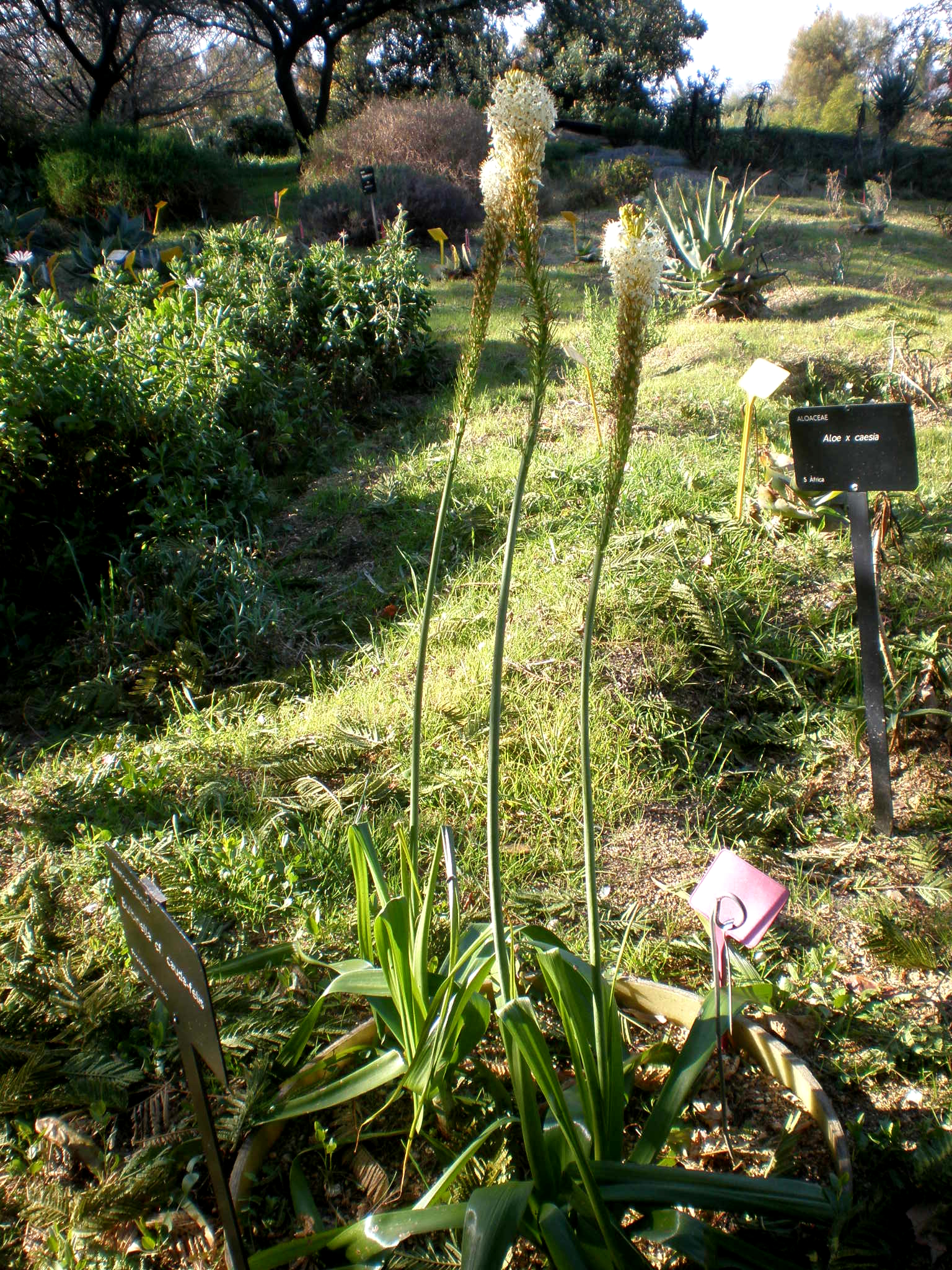

Scientific classification
- Kingdom: Plantae
- Clade: Tracheophytes
- Clade: Angiosperms
- Clade: Monocots
- Order: Asparagales
- Family: Asphodelaceae
- Subfamily: Asphodeloideae
- Genus: Bulbinella
- Species: B. cauda-felis

Binomial name
- Bulbinella cauda-felis P.L.Perry, 1987

= Bulbinella cauda-felis =

Species of flowering plant

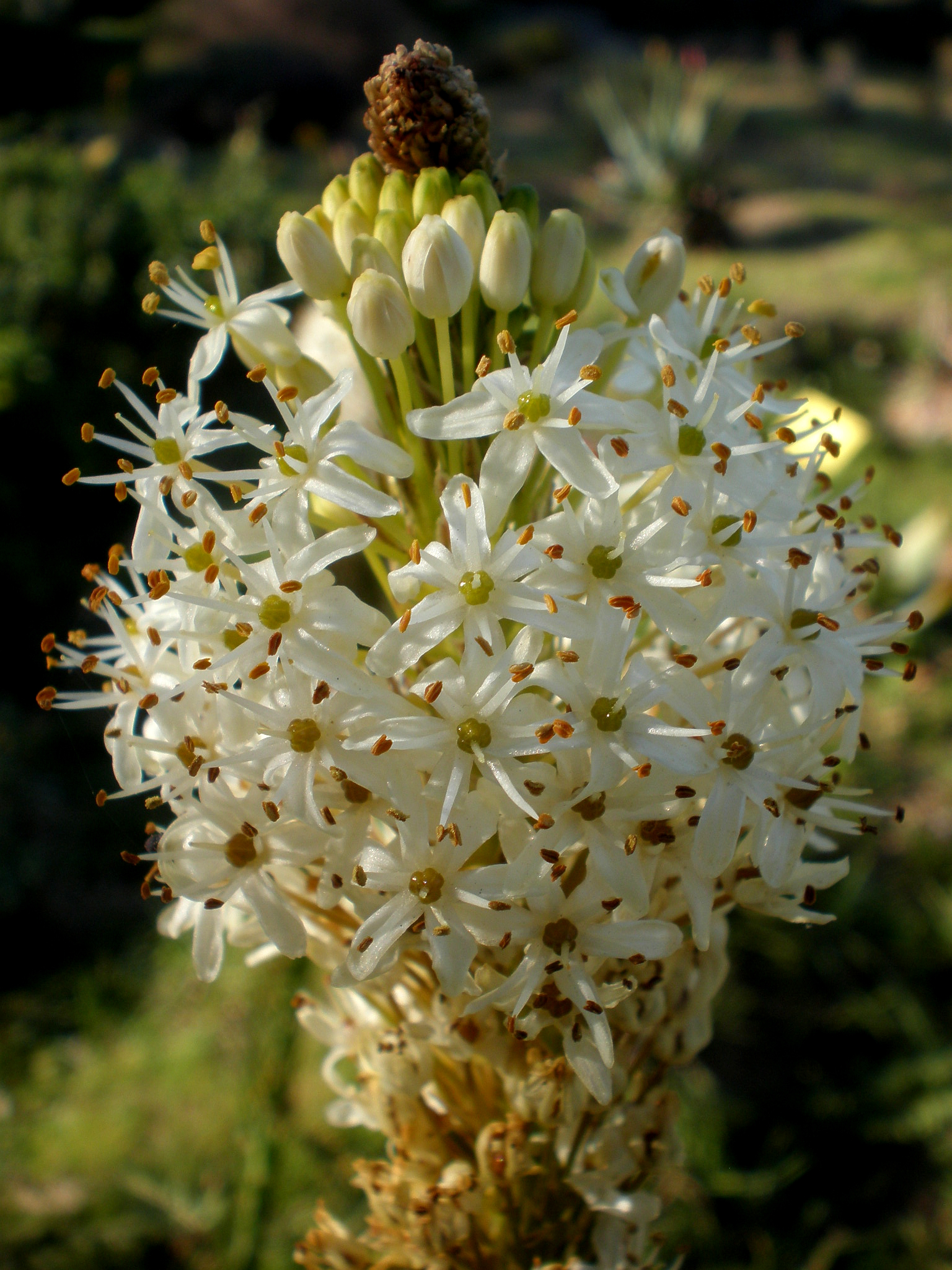
Flower detail

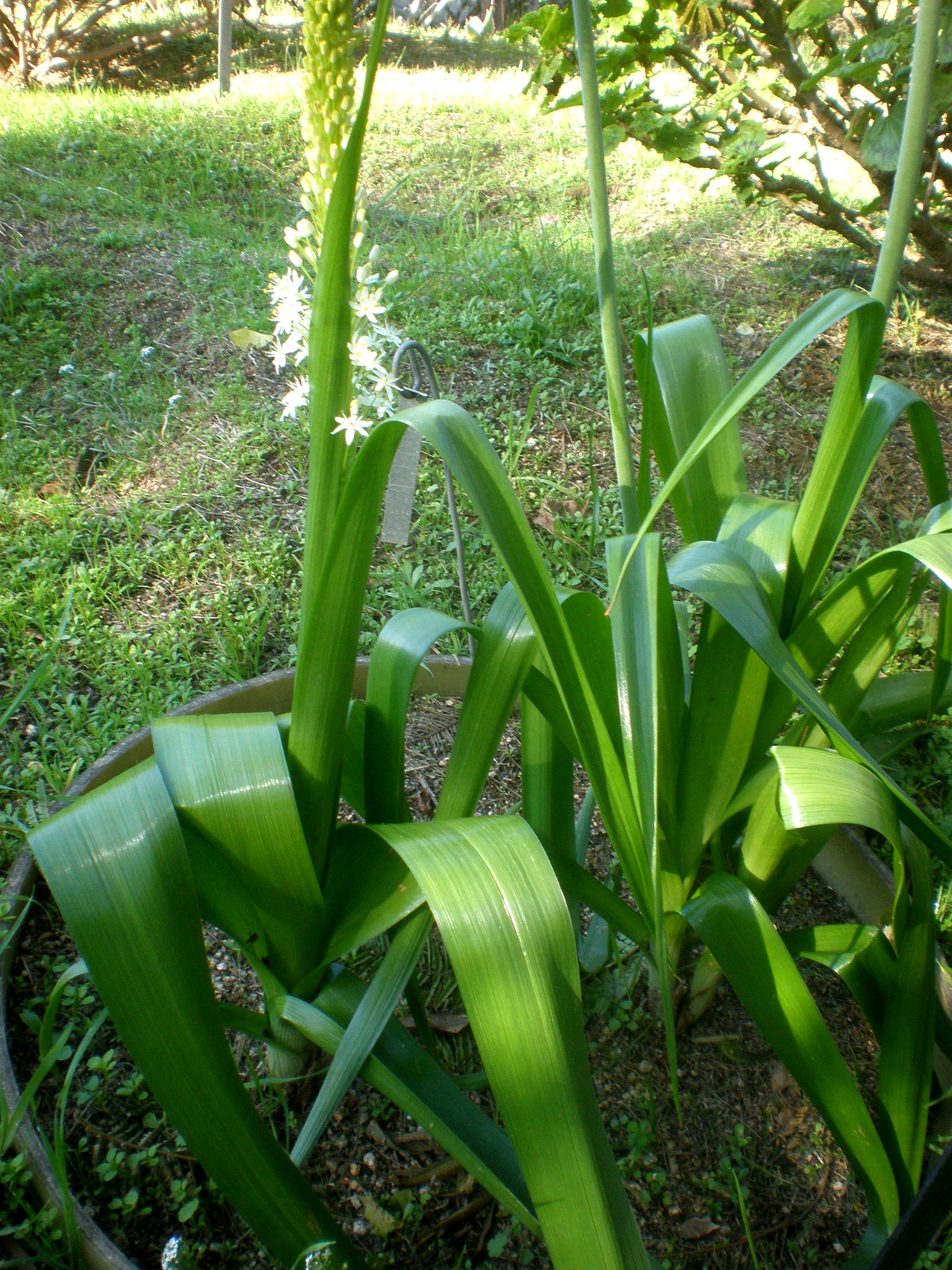
Leaf detail

Bulbinella cauda-felis ("Cat’s Tail Bulbinella") is a species of plant in the family Asphodelaceae. It is widespread in the Cape Province of South Africa. This species favours drier regions, in renosterveld and karoo vegetation, where it grows in shale or clay soils.

B. cauda-felis is a variable species, that reaches just over half a meter in height. It has up to 10 narrow (750 x 9mm) leaves, without marginal cilia or teeth, usually with a bluish colour and a dilated sheath.

The pinkish buds open into white flowers that have a pink midrib, and appear in August to December, on a long, narrowly-conical raceme. The 5mm seeds are large and nearly black. The 5mm capsules are pale brown and fragile.
