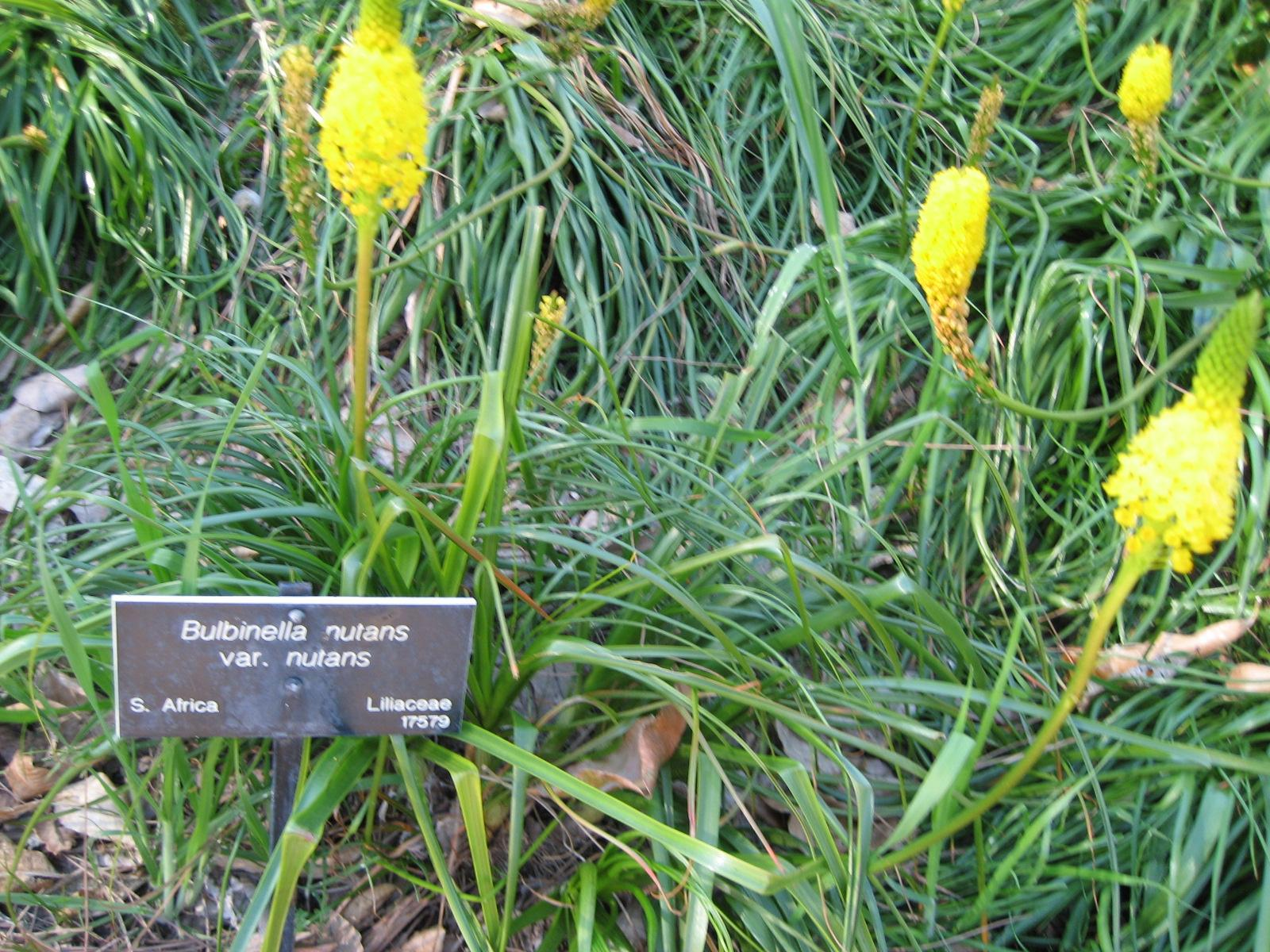
- Bulbinella nutans

Scientific classification
- Kingdom: Plantae
- Clade: Tracheophytes
- Clade: Angiosperms
- Clade: Monocots
- Order: Asparagales
- Family: Asphodelaceae
- Subfamily: Asphodeloideae
- Genus: Bulbinella
- Species: B. nutans

Binomial name
- Bulbinella nutans (Thunb.) T.Durand & Schinz

= Bulbinella nutans =

Species of flowering plant

Bulbinella nutans is a species of flowering plant in the family Asphodelaceae. It is found in the Cape Province of South Africa.

B.nutans is a large plant, reaching nearly a meter in height. It closely resembles Bulbine latifolia, but has a wider and shorter inflorescence.

B.nutans naturally occurs in the southern Cape, from Cape Town eastwards to the Robertson Karoo, Caledon, and east of Swellendam.
