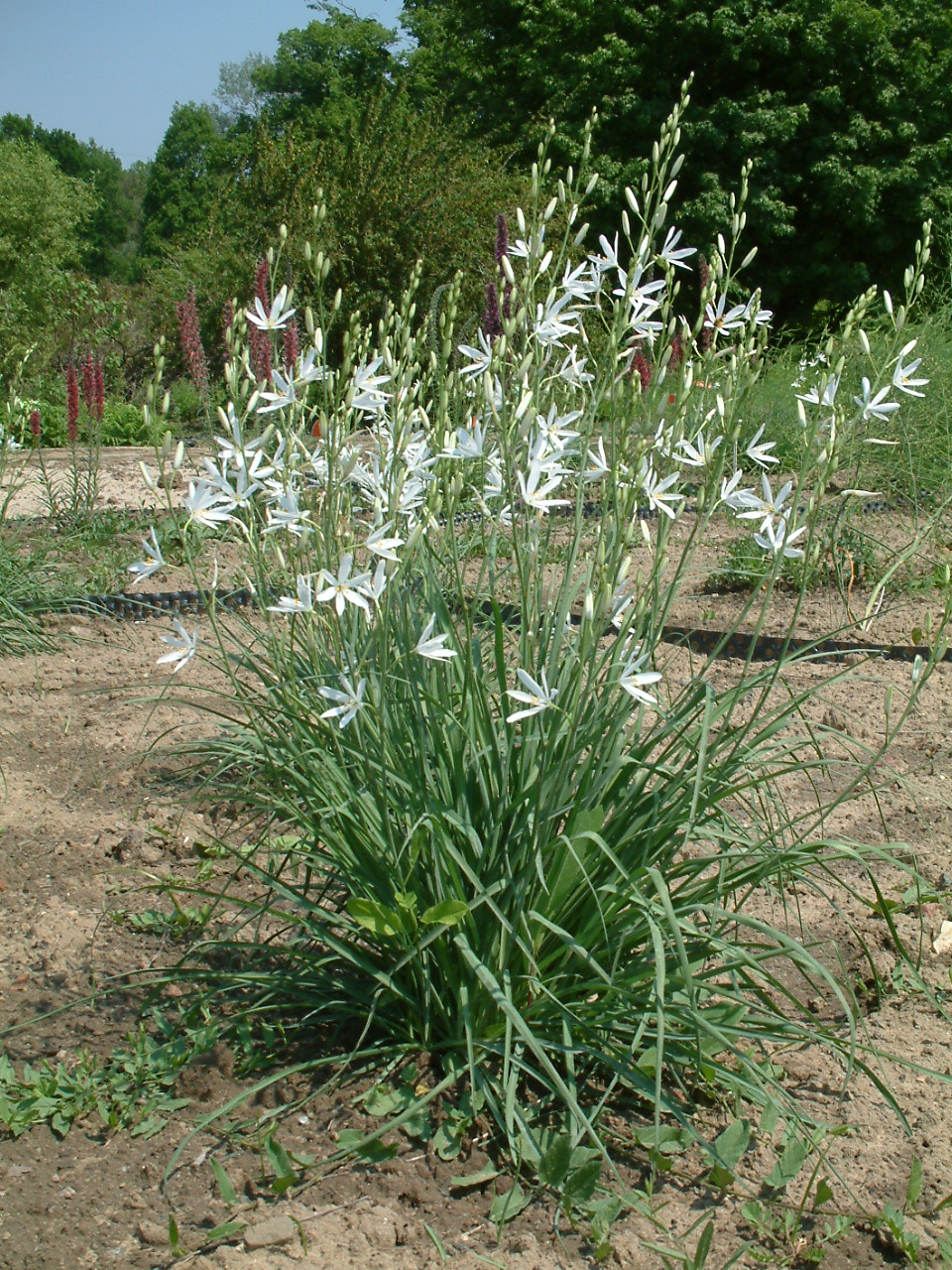

Scientific classification
- Kingdom: Plantae
- Clade: Tracheophytes
- Clade: Angiosperms
- Clade: Monocots
- Order: Asparagales
- Family: Asparagaceae
- Subfamily: Agavoideae
- Genus: Anthericum
- Species: A. liliago

Binomial name
- Anthericum liliago L.

Synonyms
- Anthericum amoenum Salisb.; Anthericum intermedium Willk.; Anthericum liliago f. macrocarpum (Boros) Soó; Anthericum liliago f. maius Bolzon; Anthericum liliago subsp. australe (Willk.) Malag., 1973; Anthericum liliago subsp. macrocarpum Boros; Anthericum liliago var. australe Willk.; Anthericum liliago var. liliago; Anthericum liliago var. multiflorum P.Küpfer; Anthericum liliago var. racemosum Döll; Anthericum liliago var. ramosum Döll; Anthericum liliago var. sphaerocarpum P.Küpfer; Anthericum liliago var. transmontanum Samp.; Anthericum macrocarpum Boros; Anthericum non-ramosum Gilib.; Anthericum non-ramosum'' infrasubsp. oppr; Liliago boetica C.Presl, 1845; Liliago vulgaris C.Presl; Ornithogalum gramineum Lam.; Phalangites liliago (L.) Bubani; Phalangium acuminatum Dulac; Phalangium lilaceum St.-Lag.; Phalangium liliaginoides Schltdl.; Phalangium liliago (L.) Schreb.; Phalangium renarnii Booth; Phalangium renarnii Booth ex Schltdl.

= Anthericum liliago =

St Bernard's lily

Species of flowering plant

Anthericum liliago, the St Bernard's lily, is a species of flowering plant in the family Asparagaceae. It is native to mainland Europe (not the British Isles) and Turkey, growing in dry pastures, stony places and open woods and flowering in early summer. In Sweden, the northernmost stable populations grows along the rocky shores of Lake Sommen (58° N), albeit on occasions it has been found as far north as Uppland (60° N).

== Etymology ==
The specific epithet liliago means lily-like or lily-carrier. Like many plants whose common names include "lily", it is not closely related to the true lilies.

== Description ==
It is a vigorous herbaceous flowering perennial with tuberous roots, 60–90 cm (2.0–3.0 ft) high, with leaves narrowly linear, 12–40 cm (4.7–15.7 in) and producing racemes of 6-10 lily-like white flowers in Spring and Summer.

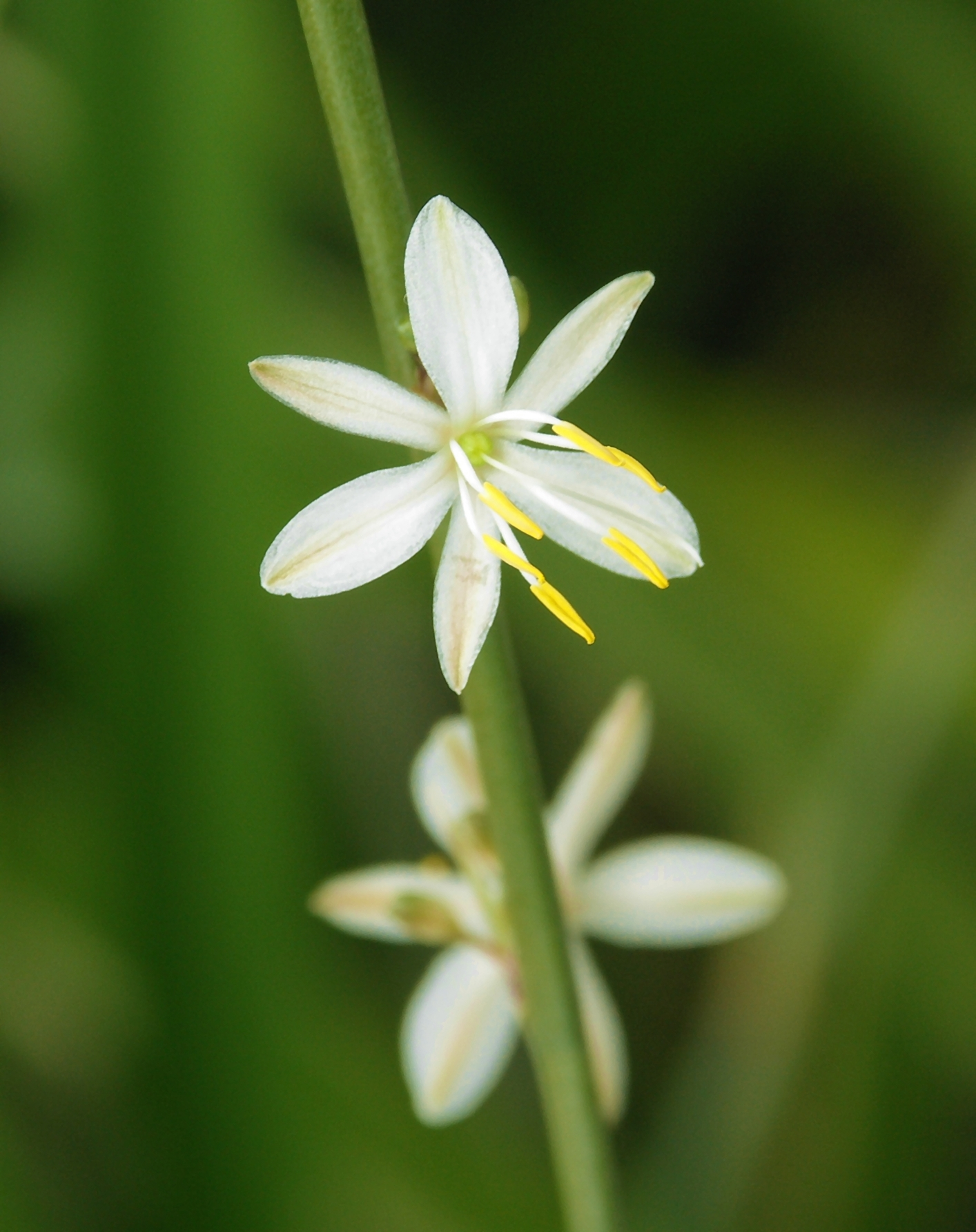
St Bernard's lily

== Cultivation ==
Best grown in well-drained soil in a sunny position, A. liliago can be propagated by seed or by division of the rootstock every 3 to 4 years. It is a slow starter but forms large clumps with time (USDA Zone 6). The cultivar 'Major' has gained the Royal Horticultural Society's Award of Garden Merit.

== See also ==
- List of plants known as lily
