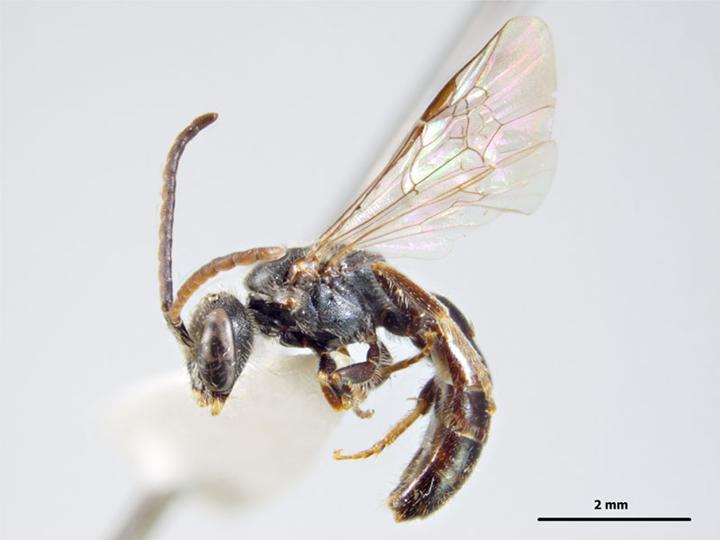

Scientific classification
- Kingdom: Animalia
- Phylum: Arthropoda
- Class: Insecta
- Order: Hymenoptera
- Family: Halictidae
- Tribe: Halictini
- Genus: Lasioglossum
- Species: L. sordidum

Binomial name
- Lasioglossum sordidum (Smith, 1853)

= Lasioglossum sordidum =

Species of bee

Lasioglossum sordidum, also referred to as the small native bee, is one of the smallest native bees found in New Zealand.

== Description ==
These bees are around 5 mm long, with relatively large wings for their body size. Most of the body is covered with hair. Their appearance is described as fly-like, and small and agile. They have short tongues, but this does not restrict their ability to gather pollen. Females have wider abdomens than the males. They appear very similar in colour and shape to a honey bee, however, the small native bee is not as stout. Lasioglossum sordidum often get mistaken for flies or go completely unnoticed as they look like small flies.

== Distribution ==
=== Natural global range ===
Lasioglossum sordidum is endemic to New Zealand.

=== New Zealand range ===
Lasioglossum sordidum is found all over New Zealand. It is one of the most abundant ground-nesting bees. The east coast South Island of New Zealand has the most adult numbers of all the native bees. There are known to be Lasioglosssum sordidum in the Christchurch Botanic Gardens, this is due to the great variation of woody and herbaceous plants, with a mixture of exotic ad native plants.

=== Habitat preferences ===
The small native bee nests on the ground, with the nest being constructed of many branching tunnels going down to 400mm below the surface in fine grained soils. Within a few square meters of bare soil, there can be up to hundreds of females nesting. They have been observed to travel rather large distances from their nests to forage for pollen. Lasioglossum sordidum females are classed as solitary but many forage within the same nest and with many generations active at any given time, this suggests some limited social organization.

== Life cycle and phenology ==
Overwinter females that have been fertilized stay in nests, coming out in late winter as the ground begins to get warmer. During the winter prepupae are in moist soils to survive the cold temperatures, In late spring and early summer new males and females begin to appear, being active during the warmer months. They are unlikely to live longer than eight weeks. Due to the lengthy time they spend nesting they forage on a wide range of flowering plants. Lasioglossum sordidum are described to have a eusocial life cycle with a mix of juveniles and adults. Eusociality is used by all bees as a system to raise young. There is limited social organization shown within the behaviours of the bee as they are usually solitary, however females forage from one nest.

== Diet and foraging ==
Lasioglossum sordidum forage over large distances, on both native and introduced plant species, they have been observed to feed on Discaria toumatou flowers. Introduced legumes and composites are favored by the females. Because of the length of time that they nest they have a large foraging distance. These bees will visit anything that has colours yellow and orange, and will visit flowers in a wide range of flowering plants. Members of the family Asteraceae are reported to be foraged on by Lasioglossum sordidum. They are also reported to forage on Hebe (plant). Females have been identified visiting 139 species in 56 families, they have the ability to forage on almost any plant that is flowering, if they can get nectar or pollen from it. Lasioglossum sordidum are polylactic which means that they can collect the pollen from many plants that are usually unrelated

== Other information ==
Lasioglossum sordidum were found to visit kiwifruit flowers, and to carry over half a million male pollen grains, this is around the same as a bumble bee.

They are nicknamed sweat bees as human perspiration attracts them.

Within the species of lasioglossum, some bees are classed as Kleptoparasites (kleptoparasitism) this is a form of parasitism where the female kills the egg or larva in the cell and then lays her egg in the cell and the egg then eats the food stored by the host.

Native bees, such as the Lasioglossum sordidum are necessary for pollination of many native plants

New Zealand lacked any pollinators with long tongues, but still had many indigenous nectar and pollen-feeding species, of those one being Lasioglossum sordidum.
