= Frederick Gibbs (educationalist) =

New Zealand educationalist, community leader (1866–1953)

Frederick Giles Gibbs (31 October 1866 – 16 January 1953) was a New Zealand school principal, educationalist, businessman, naturalist and community leader. He was born in London, England on 31 October 1866.

Gibbs was educated at Nelson College from 1879 to 1887. He completed a BA at Canterbury College in 1889 and graduated MA with first-class honours in 1890. He taught briefly at Nelson College and then for many years at Nelson Boys' School. He collaborated with botanists Thomas Kirk, T. F. Cheeseman, and Leonard Cockayne.
