= New Zealand Journal of Ecology =

Peer-reviewed scientific journal

- Discipline: Ecology
- Language: English

Publication details
- Publisher: New Zealand Ecological Society (NZ)

Standard abbreviations
- ISO 4: N. Z. J. Ecol.

Indexing
- ISSN: 0110-6465

The New Zealand Journal of Ecology is a biannual peer-reviewed scientific journal publishing ecological research relevant to New Zealand and the South Pacific. It has been published since 1952, firstly as a 1952 issue of New Zealand Science Review and then as the Proceedings of the New Zealand Ecological Society until 1977. The Journal is published by the New Zealand Ecological Society, and is covered by Current Contents/Agriculture, Biology and Environmental Science, GEOBASE, and Geo Abstracts. George Perry is the journal's current editor, with Katherine Russell as technical editor.

Free access is available to all issues in PDF format on the journal website. The compilation of PDF files from issues dating back to 1953 was funded by the New Zealand Government's Terrestrial and Freshwater Biodiversity Information System.
