= South African Journal of Botany =

Peer-reviewed scientific journal

- Language: English
- Edited by: James Stephen Boatwright

Publication details
- History: 1982–present
- Publisher: Elsevier on behalf of the South African Association of Botanists (South Africa)
- Frequency: Bimonthly
- Impact factor: 3.1 (2022)

Standard abbreviations
- ISO 4: S. Afr. J. Bot.

Indexing
- CODEN: SAJBDD
- ISSN: 0254-6299
- LCCN: 86648975

Links
- Journal homepage; Online archive

The South African Journal of Botany (Afrikaans title: Suid-Afrikaanse tydskrif vir plantkunde) is a bimonthly peer-reviewed scientific journal covering all aspects of botany as related to Southern Africa. It is published by Elsevier on behalf of the South African Association of Botanists, of which it is an official journal. It was established in 1982 and, after publishing 3 volumes, absorbed the Journal of South African Botany as of 1985. The latter journal had been established in 1935 and the merged journal continued the volume numbering of the older one. According to the Journal Citation Reports, the journal has a 2022 impact factor of 3.1
