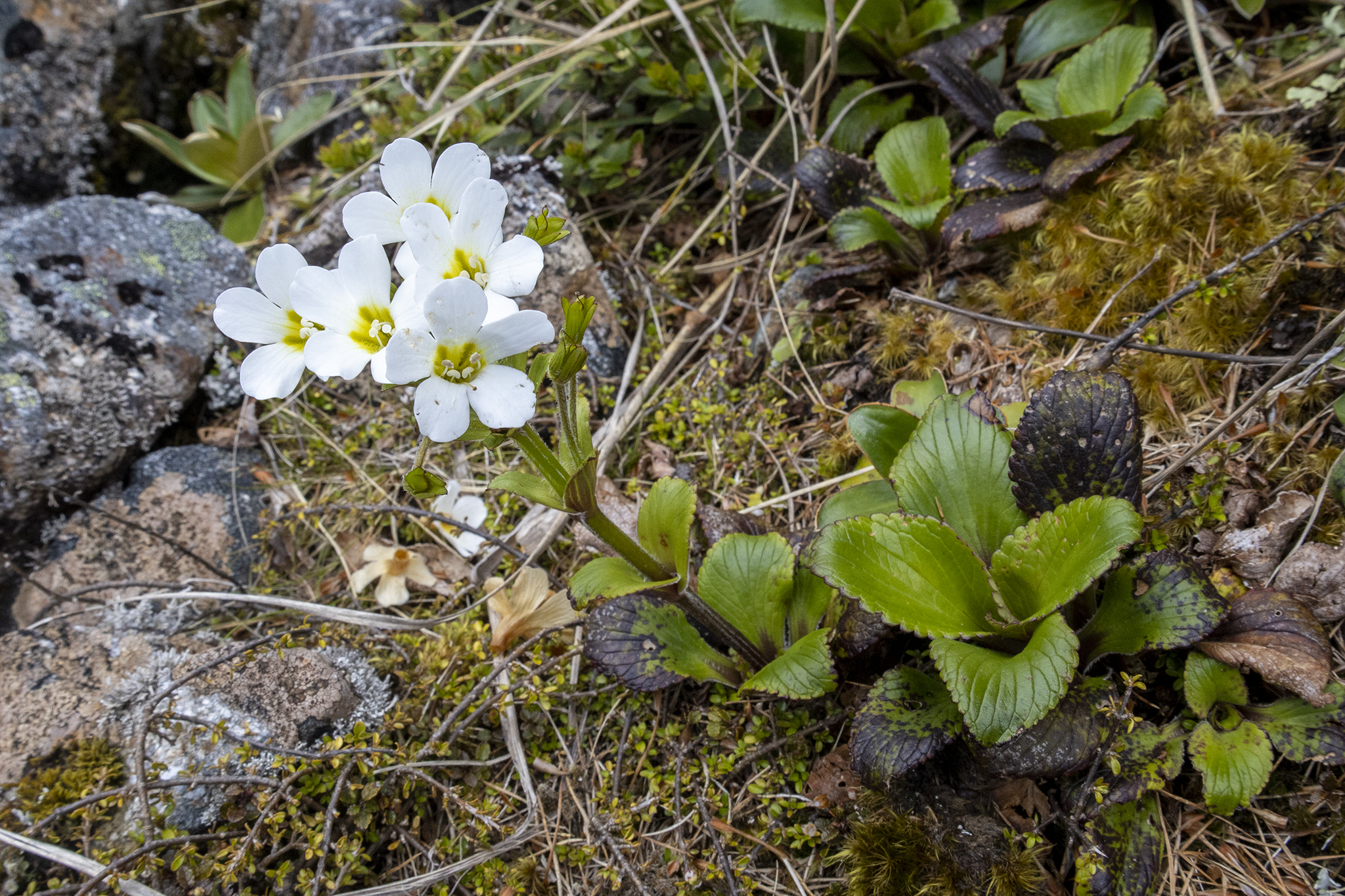
- Flowering O. calycina plant observed in Paparoa National Park, New Zealand

Conservation status
- Not Threatened (NZ TCS)

Scientific classification
- Kingdom: Plantae
- Clade: Tracheophytes
- Clade: Angiosperms
- Clade: Eudicots
- Clade: Asterids
- Order: Lamiales
- Family: Plantaginaceae
- Genus: Ourisia
- Species: O. calycina

Binomial name
- Ourisia calycina Colenso

Synonyms
- Ourisia goulandiana Arroyo; Ourisia macrocarpa var. calycina (Colenso) Cockayne; Ourisia macrocarpa susbp. calycina (Colenso) Arroyo

= Ourisia calycina =

Species of flowering plant

Ourisia calycina is a species of flowering plant in the family Plantaginaceae that is endemic to the South Island of New Zealand and was described by William Colenso in 1889. Plants of this species are showy, perennial, large-leaved, tufted, rhizomatous herbs that are mostly glabrous (hairless) or with some non-glandular hairs. They have broadly ovate leaves. The flowers are in whorls in each node, with a regular calyx, a large, white irregular corolla, and fruits up to 1 cm long. The corolla tube is yellow with three lines of yellow hairs inside. It is listed as Not Threatened.

== Taxonomy ==
Ourisia calycina Colenso is in the plant family Plantaginaceae. William Colenso described O. calycina in 1889.

The type material was collected by William Colenso from the Waimakariri River near Bealey, South Island, New Zealand. The holotype is housed at the herbarium at the Royal Botanical Gardens, Kew (K000979335).

Ourisia calycina plants are large and showy perennials with whorls of flowers with large white corollas and large fruits (up to 1 cm long), characters they share with other New Zealand species O. macrocarpa and O. macrophylla. Like O. calycina, South American species O. coccinea and O. ruellioides are also large and showy with large fruits, but their flowers are in pairs instead of whorls in each node, and have red corollas.

Ourisia calycina is morphologically most similar to another large-leaved New Zealand species, O. macrocarpa. Although Colenso first described O. calycina as a species, Leonard Cockayne and Lucy Moore treated it as a variety of O. macrocarpa, and Mary Kalin Arroyo treated it as a subspecies of O. macrocarpa. Although Heidi Meudt also considered O. calycina to be a subspecies of O. macrocarpa in her monograph, a later phylogenetic study that showed that O. macrocarpa and O. calycina were not each other's closest relatives, which lead the authors to conclude that species rank would be more suitable.

Ourisia goulandiana Arroyo was described in 1984 but is now considered to be a synonym as no morphological characteristics could be found to distinguish it from O. calycina.

A number of morphological differences also distinguish O. calycina from O. macrocarpa, including its narrowly to broadly ovate leaves (vs. broadly to very broadly ovate, cuneate to truncate leaf bases (vs rounded to cordate), petiole fringed with hairs for its entire length (vs fringed on lower margins only), irregularly notched calyx lobe edges (vs smooth calyx lobe edges), regular calyx (vs irregular calyx), and hairy peduncle (vs glabrous). In addition, the two species are allopatric with O. calycina found in northern and central South Island, and O. macrocarpa found in southern South Island only.

Ourisia calycina can be distinguished from another large-leaved species, O. macrophylla, by its notched or irregularly toothed calyx lobes (vs. calyx lobes with smooth edges), and a lack of glandular hairs anywhere on the mostly hairless plants (vs. glandular hairs present at least on the pedicel and generally hairy plants).

== Description ==
Ourisia calycina plants are large perennial herbs. The stems are creeping, with opposite leaves that are tightly tufted along the horizontal stem. Leaf petioles are 7.2–109.6 mm long. Leaf blades are 12.3–135.1 mm long by 7.4–71.4 mm wide (length: width ratio 1.0–1.7: 1), narrowly to very broadly ovate, widest below the middle, with an acute apex; cuneate or truncate base; and regularly crenate edges. Leaves are mostly glabrous (hairless), except for a fringe of densely distributed, long non-glandular hairs on the lower edges, and densely punctate on the lower surface, also with non-glandular hairs on the midvein. Inflorescences are erect, with racemes up to 61 cm long that have that lines of non-glandular hairs on the peduncle, 1–8 flowering nodes and up to 32 or more total flowers per raceme. Each flowering node has up to 9 flowers and 3–9 sessile and clasping bracts that are usually lanceolate to narrowly ovate or oblanceolate to obovate. The lowest bracts are similar to the leaves, 20.4–76.1 mm long and 6.2–36.3 mm wide, and become smaller toward the apex of the raceme. The flowers are borne on a glabrous or hairy pedicel that is up to 64.7 mm long and has non-glandular hairs only. The calyx is 7.5–12.2 mm long, regular, with all lobes equally divided to the base, acute, and with smooth or irregularly notched edges, with a few non-glandular hairs to densely distributed hairs on the edges and base. The corolla is 16.4–31.3 mm long (including the 5.7–16.1 mm long corolla tube), bilabiate, tubular-funnelform, glabrous and white (sometimes flushed pink) on the outside, and yellow and with three lines of yellow hairs on the inside. The corolla lobes are 5.9–15.3 mm long, spreading, and obovate or obcordate. There are 4 stamens up to 15.9 mm long which are didynamous, with two long stamens that are exserted, and 2 short stamens reaching the corolla tube opening; a short staminode 0.5–4.1 mm long is also present. The style is 5.5–10.7 mm long, exserted or reaching the corolla tube opening, with an emarginate stigma. The ovary is 3.0–4.6 mm long and glabrous. Fruits are capsules 5.0–9.9 mm long and 4.0–8.0 mm wide with loculicidal dehiscence and pedicels up to 80.5 mm long. There are c. 630 seeds in each capsule, and seeds are 0.4–1.3 mm long and 0.1–0.8 mm wide, with a two-layered, reticulate seed coat.

Ourisia calycina flowers from October to March and fruits from December to March.

The chromosome number of Ourisia calycina is 2n=48.

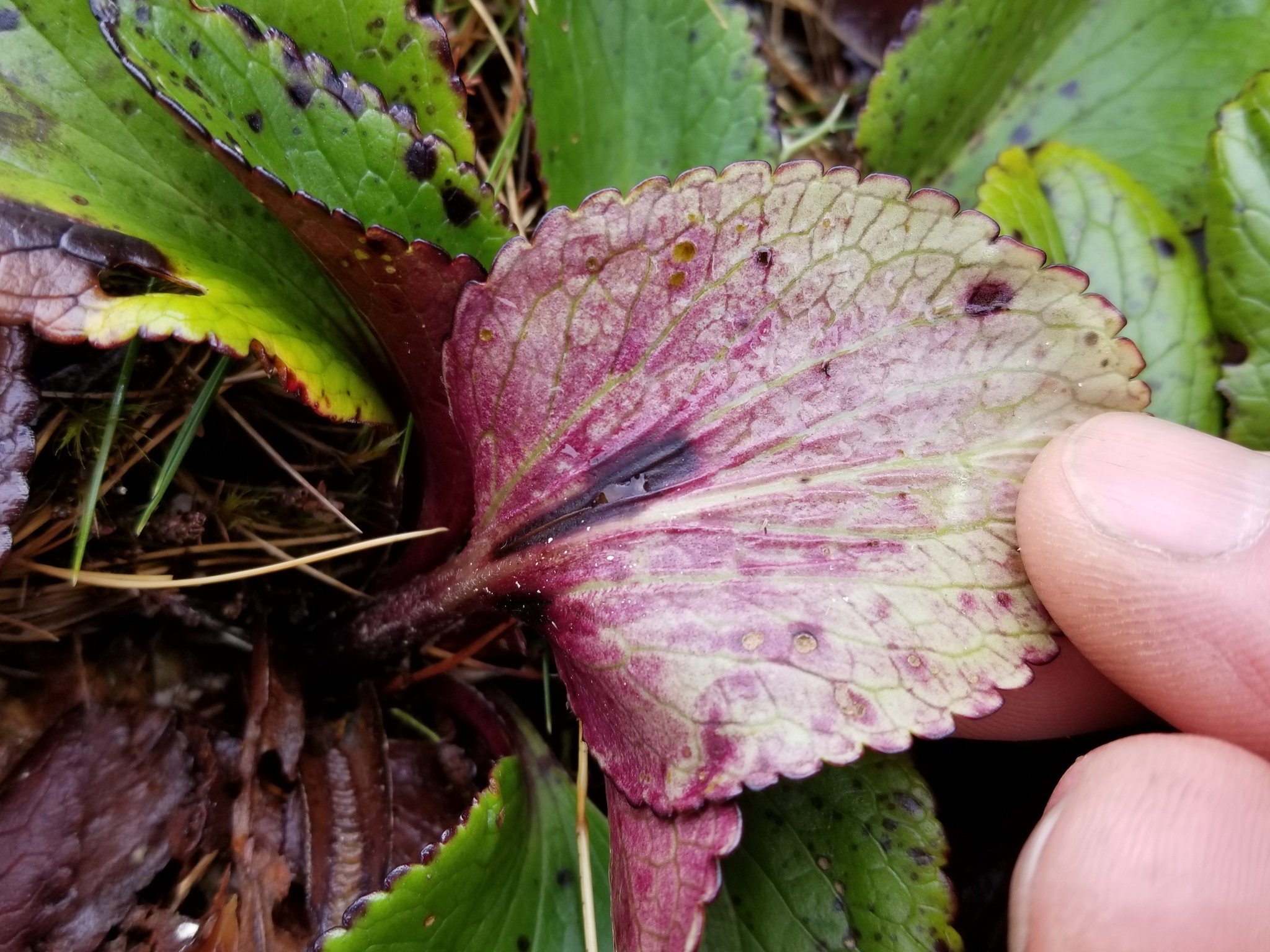
Underside of a leaf

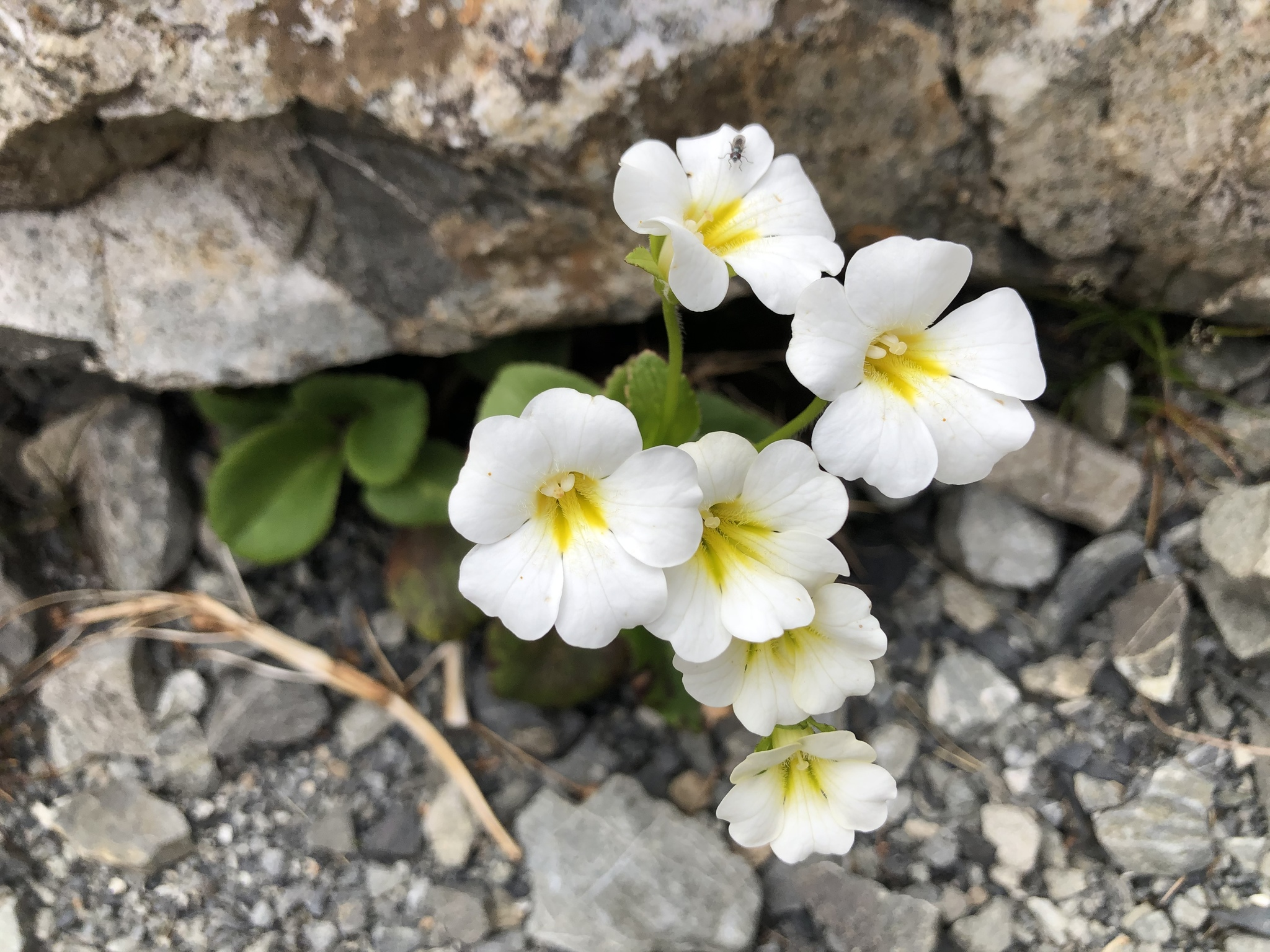
Close-up of flowers

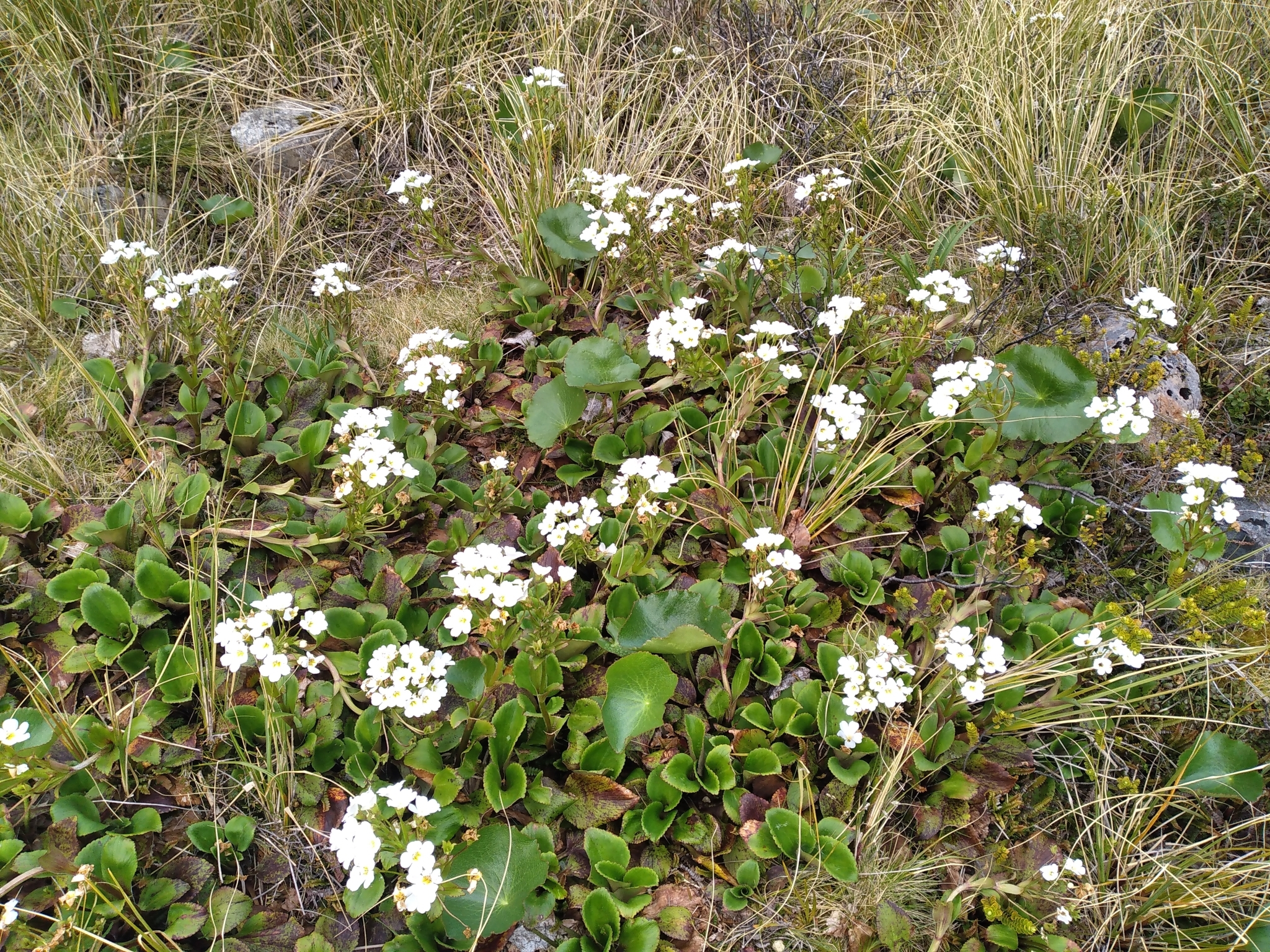
Flowering plants in subalpine habitat

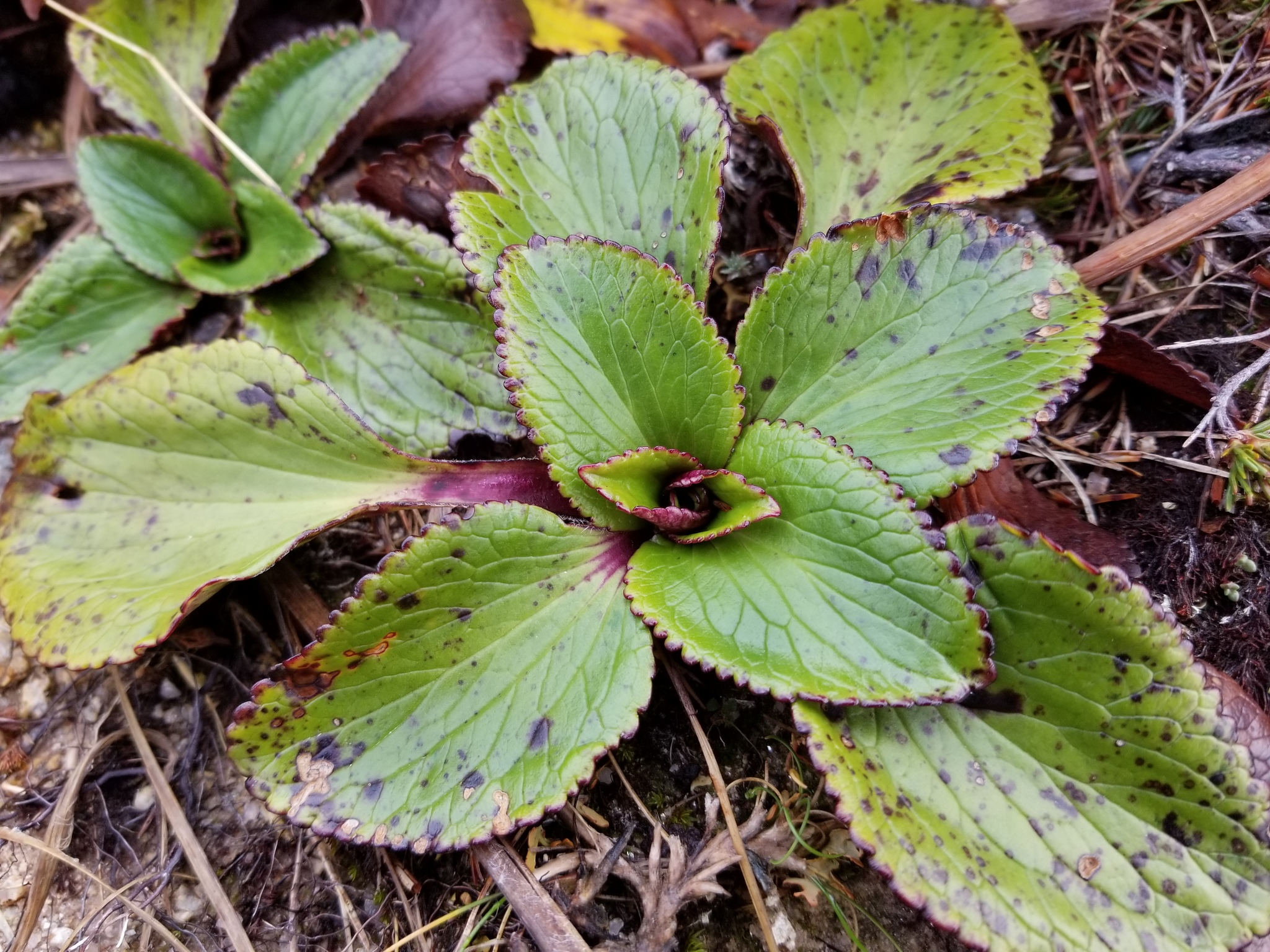
Leaves

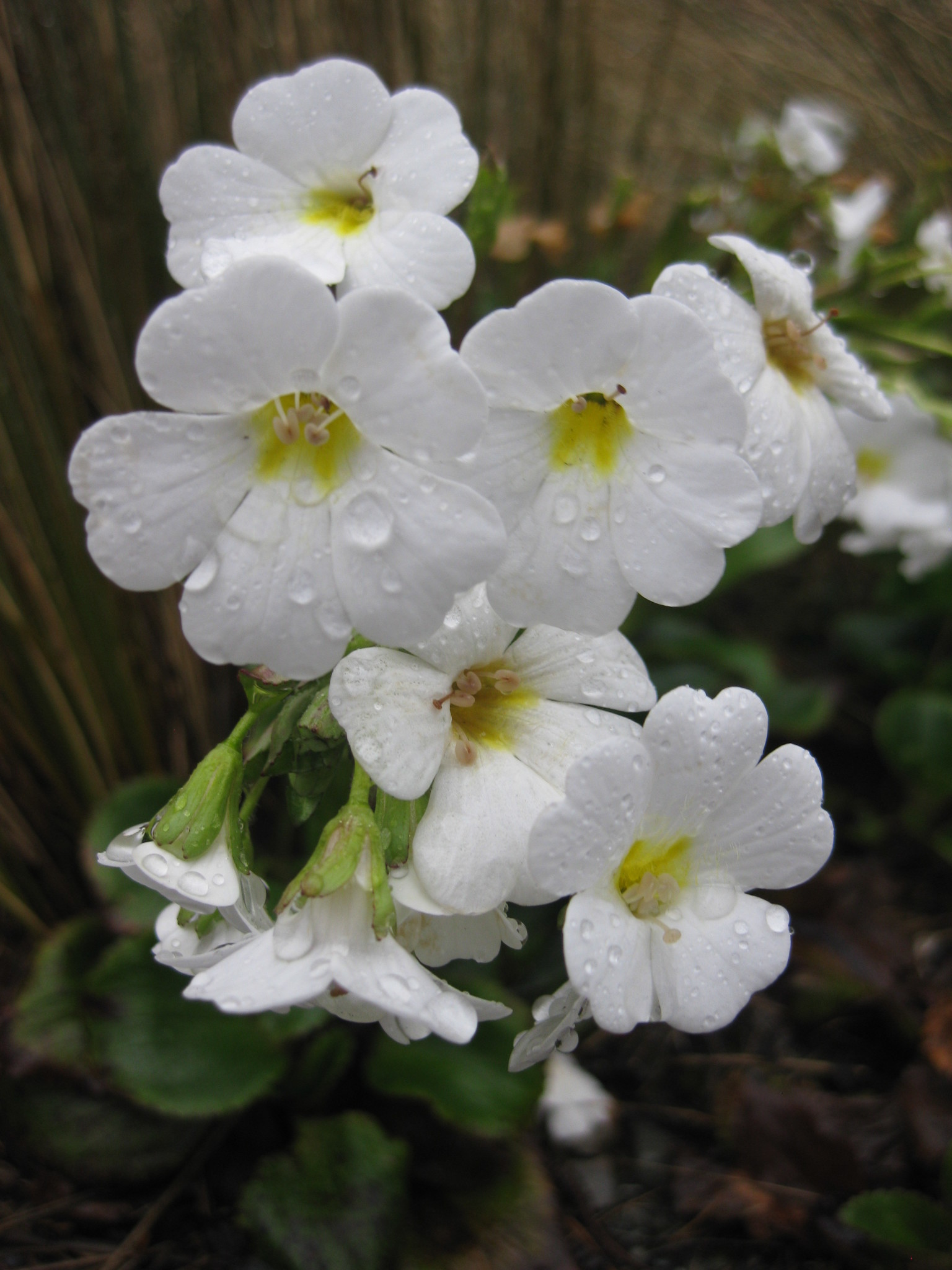
Flowers, two on lower left showing regular calyces

== Distribution and habitat ==
Ourisia calycina is endemic to northern and central South Island, New Zealand, particularly Canterbury and Westland (there are two specimens also known from northern Fiordland). It is found in herbfields, scrub, meadows and grasslands in damp, sheltered, rocky or open montane to subalpine habitats from 540 to 2,000 m (1,770 to 6,560 ft) above sea level.

== Phylogeny ==
One individual of O. calycina was included in phylogenetic analyses of all species of the genus Ourisia using standard DNA sequencing markers (two nuclear ribosomal DNA markers and two chloroplast DNA regions) and morphological data. In the nuclear and combined molecular analyses, the sampled individuals belonged to the highly supported New Zealand lineage, and was usually sister to a clade of several other large-leaved species including O. macrophylla, O. crosbyi, and O. vulcanica (but not O. macrocarpa).

In another phylogenetic study using amplified fragment length polymorphisms (AFLPs), all 10 sampled individuals of O. calycina formed a highly supported clade that was sister to the North Island species, O. vulcanica. The 10 sampled individuals of O. calycina did not however comprise one of the significant clusters in the Bayesian clustering analysis.

== Conservation status ==
Ourisia calycina is listed as Not Threatened in the most recent assessment (2017–2018) of the New Zealand Threatened Classification for plants.
