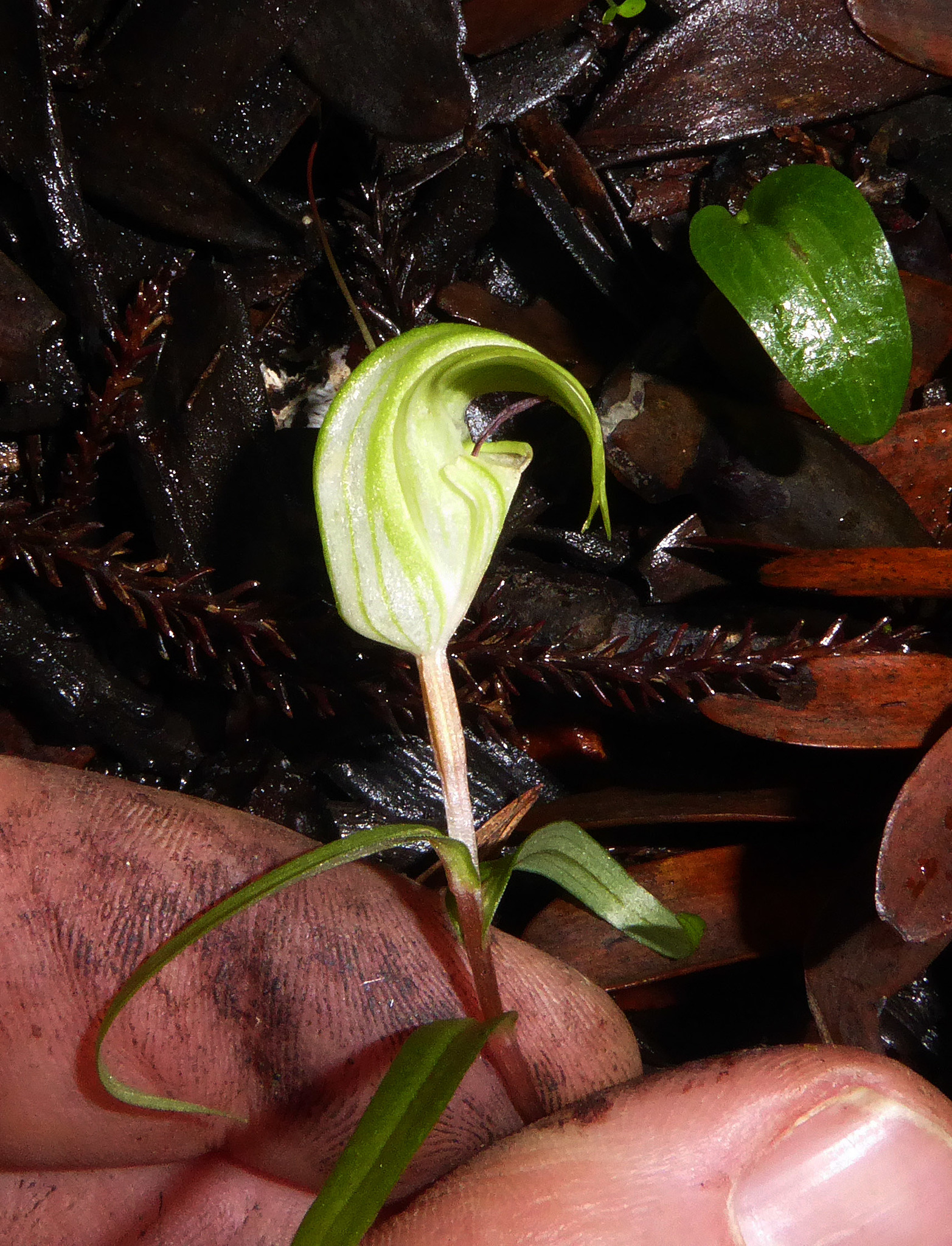

Scientific classification
- Kingdom: Plantae
- Clade: Tracheophytes
- Clade: Angiosperms
- Clade: Monocots
- Order: Asparagales
- Family: Orchidaceae
- Subfamily: Orchidoideae
- Tribe: Cranichideae
- Genus: Pterostylis
- Species: P. brumalis

Binomial name
- Pterostylis brumalis L.B.Moore

Synonyms
- Diplodium brumale (L.B.Moore) D.L.Jones, Molloy & M.A.Clem.

= Pterostylis brumalis =

Kauri greenhood

Species of orchid

Pterostylis brumalis, commonly known as kauri greenhood or winter greenhood, is a species of orchid endemic to New Zealand. There is a rosette of leaves at the base of both flowering and non-flowering plants. Flowering plants have a white flower with narrow green stripes and a dorsal sepal which bends forward strongly while the petals spread widely, giving the flower a cobra-like appearance.

== Description ==
Pterostylis brumalis is a terrestrial, perennial, deciduous, herb with an underground tuber and a rosette of egg-shaped to almost round leaves. The rosette leaves are 5–12 mm (0.2–0.5 in) long and wide with a petiole up to 10 mm (0.4 in) long. Flowering plants usually have a single white flower with narrow dark green stripes borne on a stem up to 200 mm (8 in) high with between two and six stem leaves. The stem leaves are 15–40 mm (0.6–2 in) long and 2–8 mm (0.08–0.3 in) wide. The dorsal sepal and petals are fused, forming a hood or "galea" over the column. The dorsal sepal curves forward strongly and then downwards with a pointed tip and the petals are flared giving the flower a cobra-like appearance. The lateral sepals are held closely against the galea and have thread-like tips which spread widely apart from each other and a flat, protruding sinus between their bases. The labellum is triangular in cross-section and protrudes above the sinus. Flowering occurs between April and October.

== Taxonomy and naming ==
Pterostylis brumalis was first formally described in 1939 by Lucy Beatrice Moore from a specimen collected near Laingholm and the description was published in New Zealand Journal of Botany. The specific epithet (brumalis) is a Latin word meaning "wintery", from bruma, the "shortest day" or "winter solstice", referring to the winter flowering of this greenhood.

== Distribution and habitat ==
Kauri greenhood only grows in kauri (Agathis australis) forest or where there are kauri remnants. It usually grows in shady places with kauri leaf litter. It is found on the North Island between Cape Reinga, Kāwhia Harbour and the Kaimai Range.
