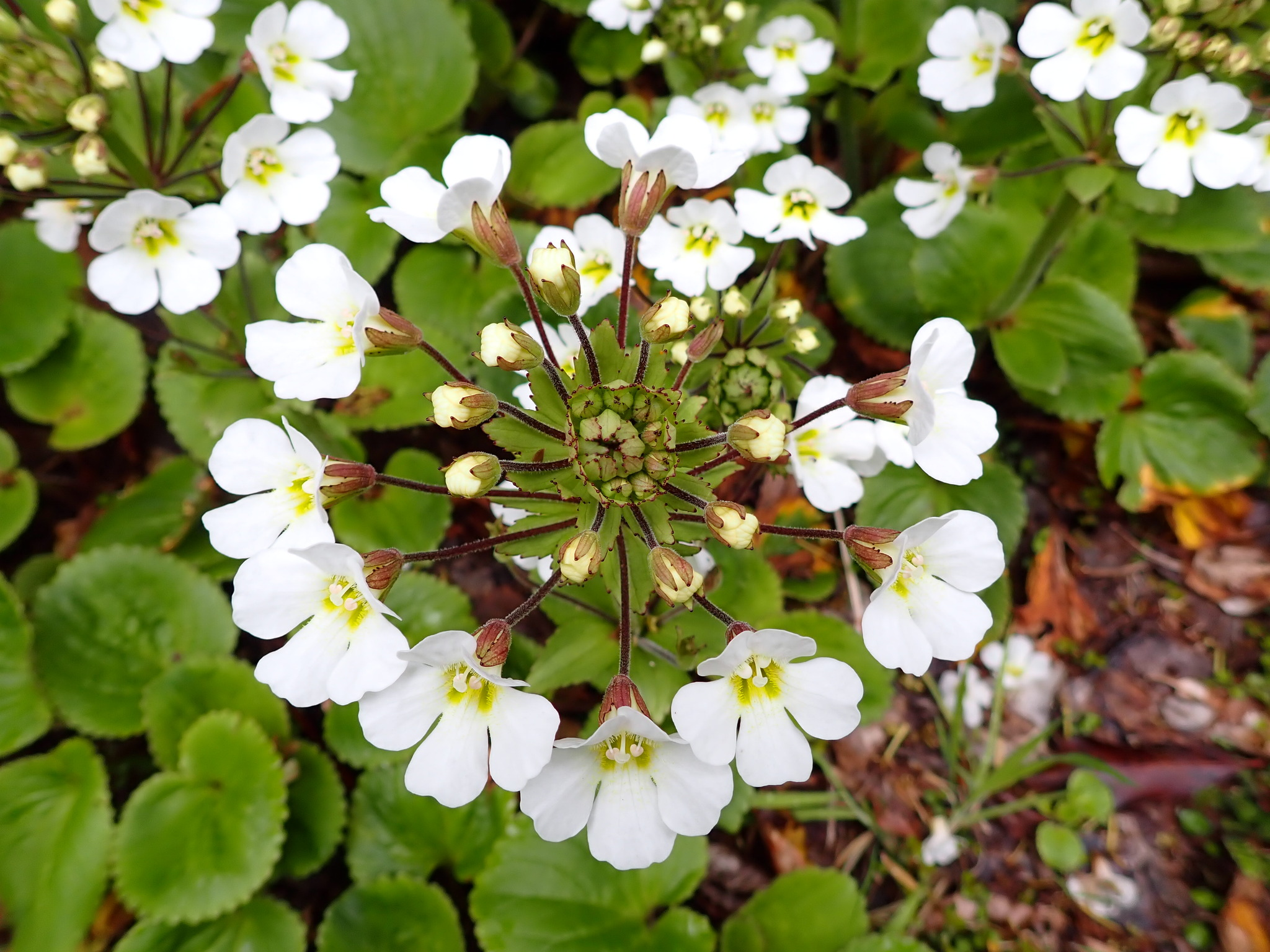
- Flowering O. macrophylla plant observed in Egmont National Park, New Zealand

Conservation status
- Not Threatened (NZ TCS)

Scientific classification
- Kingdom: Plantae
- Clade: Tracheophytes
- Clade: Angiosperms
- Clade: Eudicots
- Clade: Asterids
- Order: Lamiales
- Family: Plantaginaceae
- Genus: Ourisia
- Species: O. macrophylla

Binomial name
- Ourisia macrophylla Hook.

= Ourisia macrophylla =

Species of flowering plant

Ourisia macrophylla is a species of flowering plant in the family Plantaginaceae that is endemic to New Zealand. William Jackson Hooker described O. macrophylla in 1843. Plants of this species of New Zealand foxglove are showy, perennial, large-leaved, tufted, rhizomatous herbs that are often glabrous (hairless) or sometimes hairy with non-glandular or glandular hairs. They have crenate, ovate to heart-shaped leaves. The flowers are in whorls in each node, with a regular calyx, and a large, white irregular corolla. The corolla tube is yellow with three lines of yellow hairs inside. It is found in montane to subalpine habitats and is listed as Not Threatened.

== Taxonomy ==
Ourisia macrophylla Hook. is in the plant family Plantaginaceae. William Jackson Hooker described O. macrophylla in 1843.

The type material was collected by German botanist Ernst Dieffenbach on "Mt Egmont" (Mt Taranaki). The holotype is housed at the herbarium of the Royal Botanical Gardens Kew.

Ourisia macrophylla plants are large, showy, hairy perennials with whorls of flowers with large white corollas, and three lines of yellow hairs inside the corolla tube, characters they share with another New Zealand species, O. crosbyi.

A number of morphological differences also distinguish O. macrophylla from O. crosbyi, including its crenate leaves and bracts (vs. serrate or serrate-crenate), flowers that are hairy on the outside (vs. not hairy), and pedicels with glandular and non-glandular hairs (vs. pedicels with non-glandular hairs only).

In the Flora of New Zealand, Lucy Moore recognised five varieties within O. macrophylla as well as O. colensoi, whereas Mary Kalin Arroyo recognised two subspecies of O. macrophylla and two subspecies of O. lactea.

In the most recent taxonomic treatment, only two allopatric subspecies of O. macrophylla are recognised: North Island Ourisia macrophylla subsp. macrophylla and South Island O. macrophylla subsp. lactea. The subspecies can be distinguished from one another by the hairs on the calyx and floral bracts, which lack glandular hairs in subsp. macrophylla but have glandular hairs in subsp. lactea.

== Description ==
Ourisia macrophylla plants are large perennial herbs. The stems are creeping, with opposite leaves that are tightly tufted along the horizontal stem. Leaf petioles are 4.3–225.0 mm long. Leaf blades are 10.4–160.0 mm long by 5.9–99.0 mm wide (length: width ratio 0.9–2.3: 1), usually narrowly ovate to broadly ovate, widest below the middle, with an acute or rounded apex; truncate, rounded, cuneate or cordate base; and crenate to crenate-serrate edges. Leaves are glabrous or with few hairs to densely hairy with non-glandular hairs on both surfaces, and punctate on the lower surface. Inflorescences are erect, with hairy racemes up to 64.8 cm long, and with 1–6 flowering nodes and up to 53 total flowers per raceme. Each flowering node has up to 12 flowers and 2–12 sessile and sometimes clasping bracts that are usually narrowly lanceolate to narrowly ovate. The lowest bracts are similar to the leaves, 10.4–78.9 mm long and 4.0–32.0 mm wide, and become smaller toward the apex of the raceme. The flowers are borne on a densely hairy pedicel that is up to 56.4 mm long and has glandular hairs and sometimes also non-glandular hairs only. The calyx is 3.6–10.0 mm long, regular, with all five lobes divided to the base, and with isolated to sparsely distributed hairs, which are usually a mixture of glandular and non-glandular hairs. The corolla is 10.3–22.2 mm long (including the 2.9–12.3 mm long corolla tube), bilabiate, tubular-funnelform, usually hairy, and white on the outside (sometimes flushed pink), and yellow and with three lines and a ring of yellow hairs on the inside. The corolla lobes are 3.1–11.1 mm long, spreading, and obcordate or obovate-spathulate. There are 4 stamens up to 11.2 mm long which are didynamous, with two long stamens that are exserted or reaching the corolla tube, and 2 short stamens also usually reaching the corolla tube opening; a short staminode 0.3–1.0 mm long is also usually present. The style is 3.7–8.2 mm long, exserted, with an emarginate stigma. The ovary is 1.6–4.4 mm long and glabrous. Fruits are capsules 4.3–8.6 mm long and 3.7–6.0 mm wide with loculicidal dehiscence and pedicels up to 74.6 mm long. It is unknown how many seeds are in each capsule, and seeds are 0.5–1.1 mm long and 0.2–0.4 mm wide, with a two-layered, reticulate seed coat.

Ourisia macrophylla flowers from August to April and fruits from October to May.

The chromosome number of Ourisia macrophylla is 2n=48.

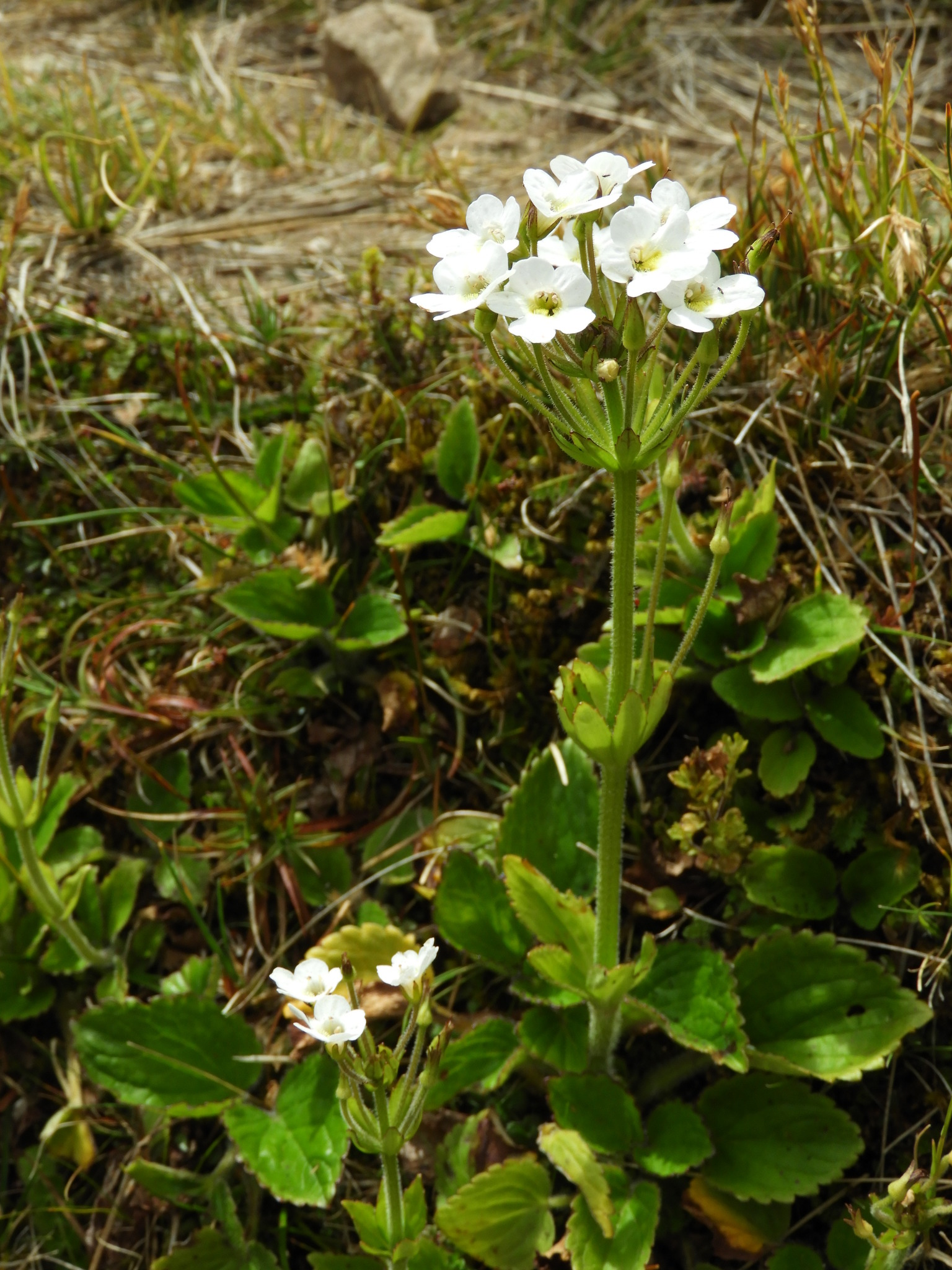
Habit (subsp. macrophylla)

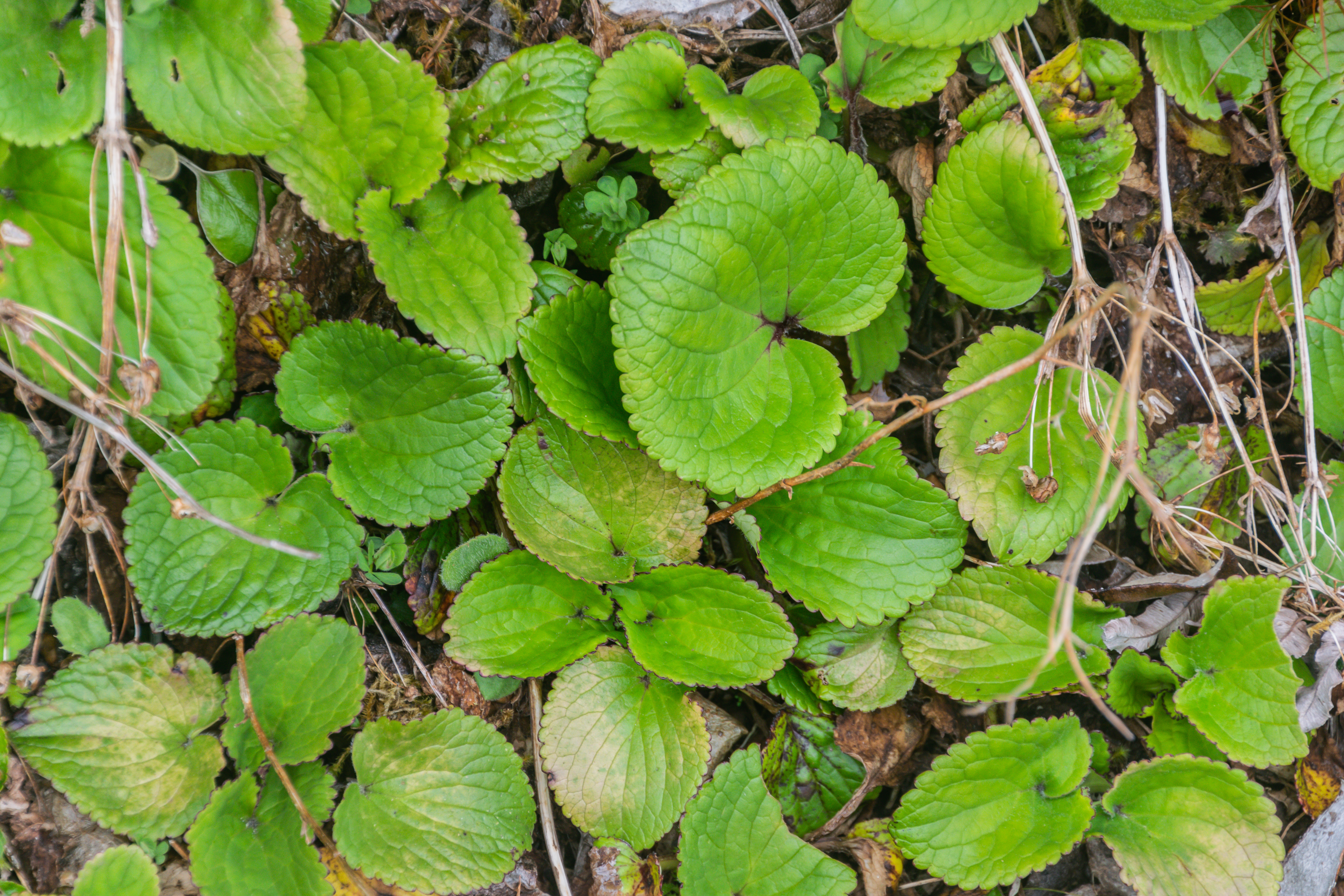
Heart-shaped leaves (subsp. macrophylla)

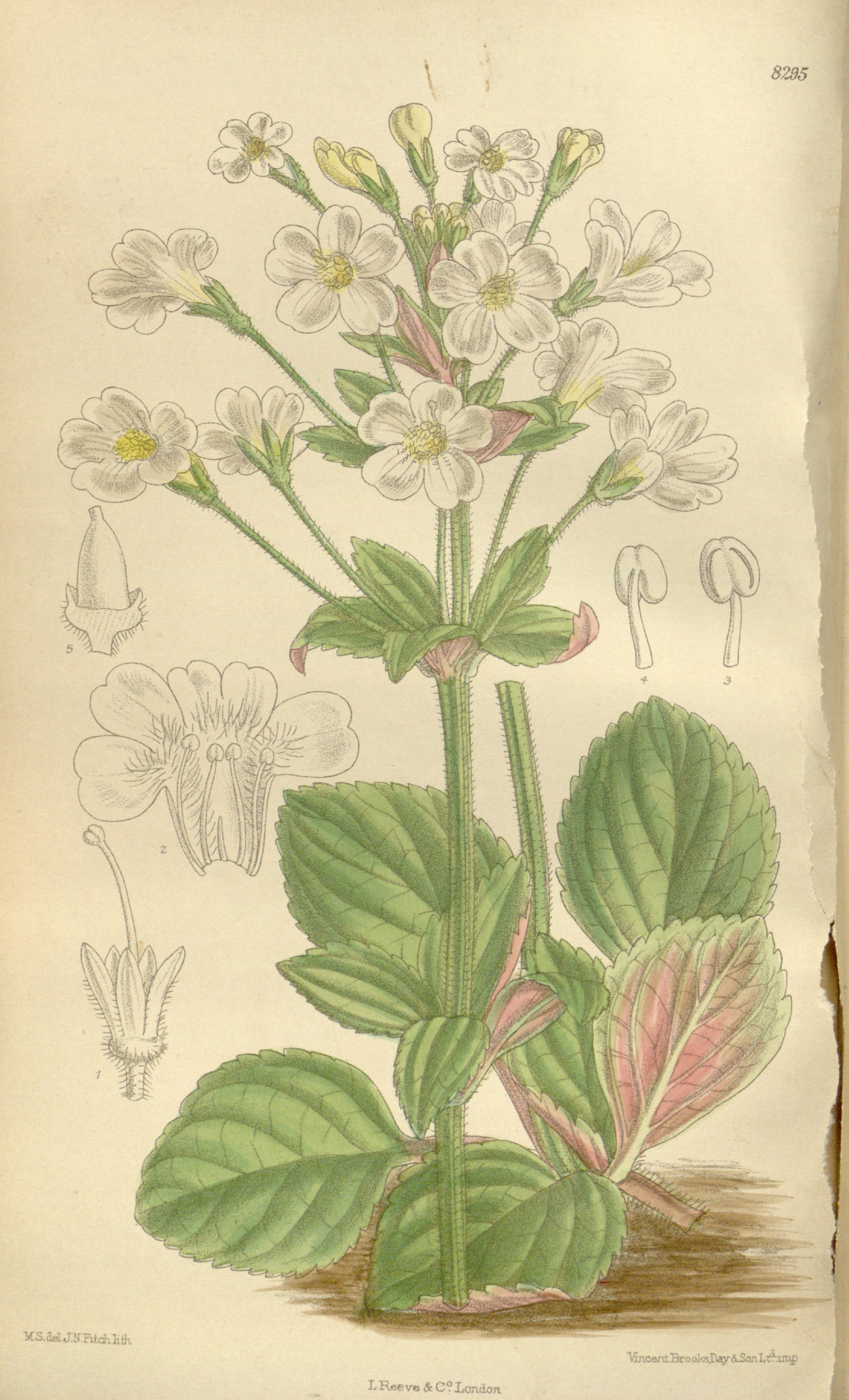
Illustration of whole plant by Matilda Smith

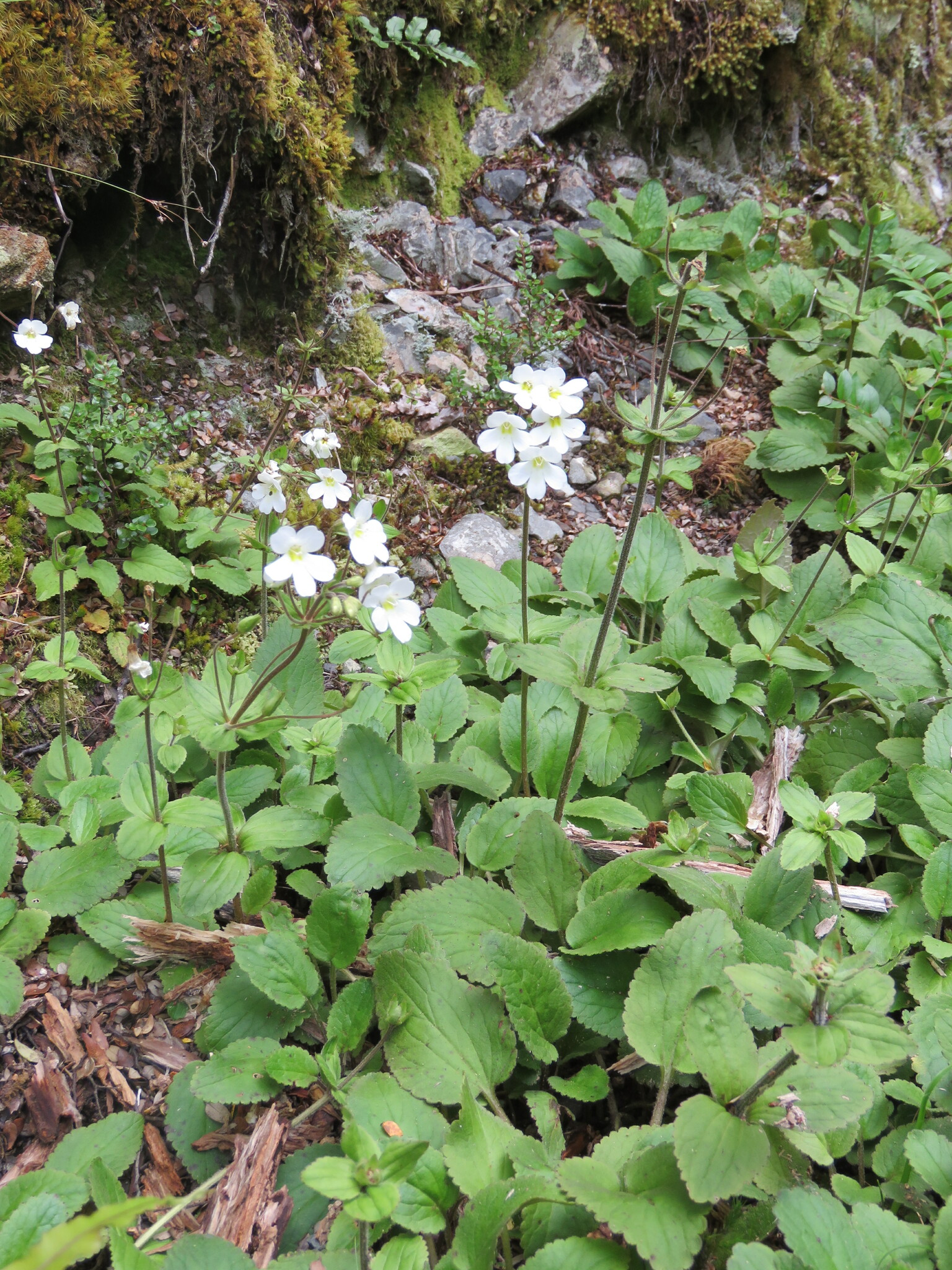
Habit (subsp. lactea)

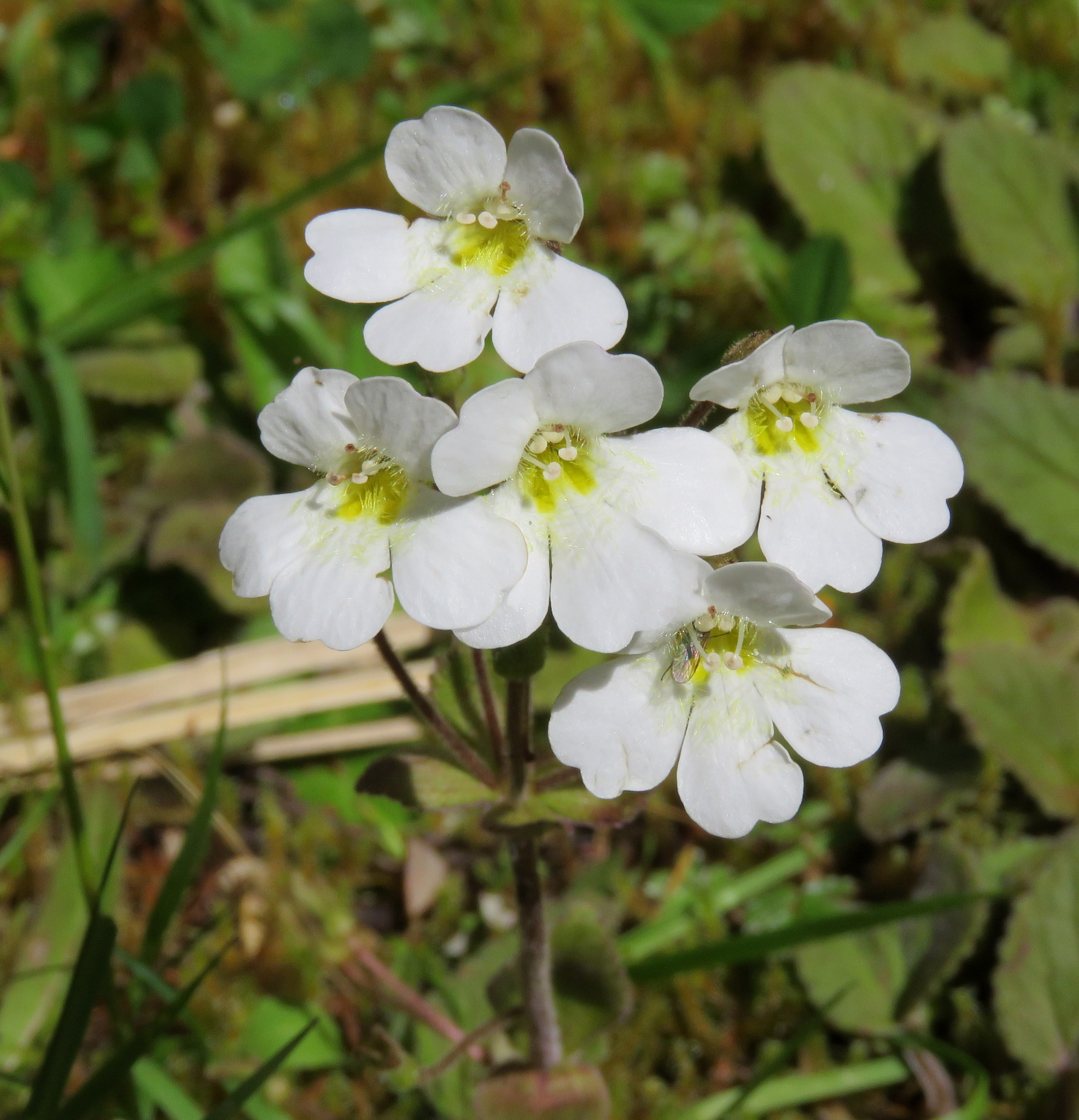
Flowers (subsp. lactea)

== Distribution and habitat ==
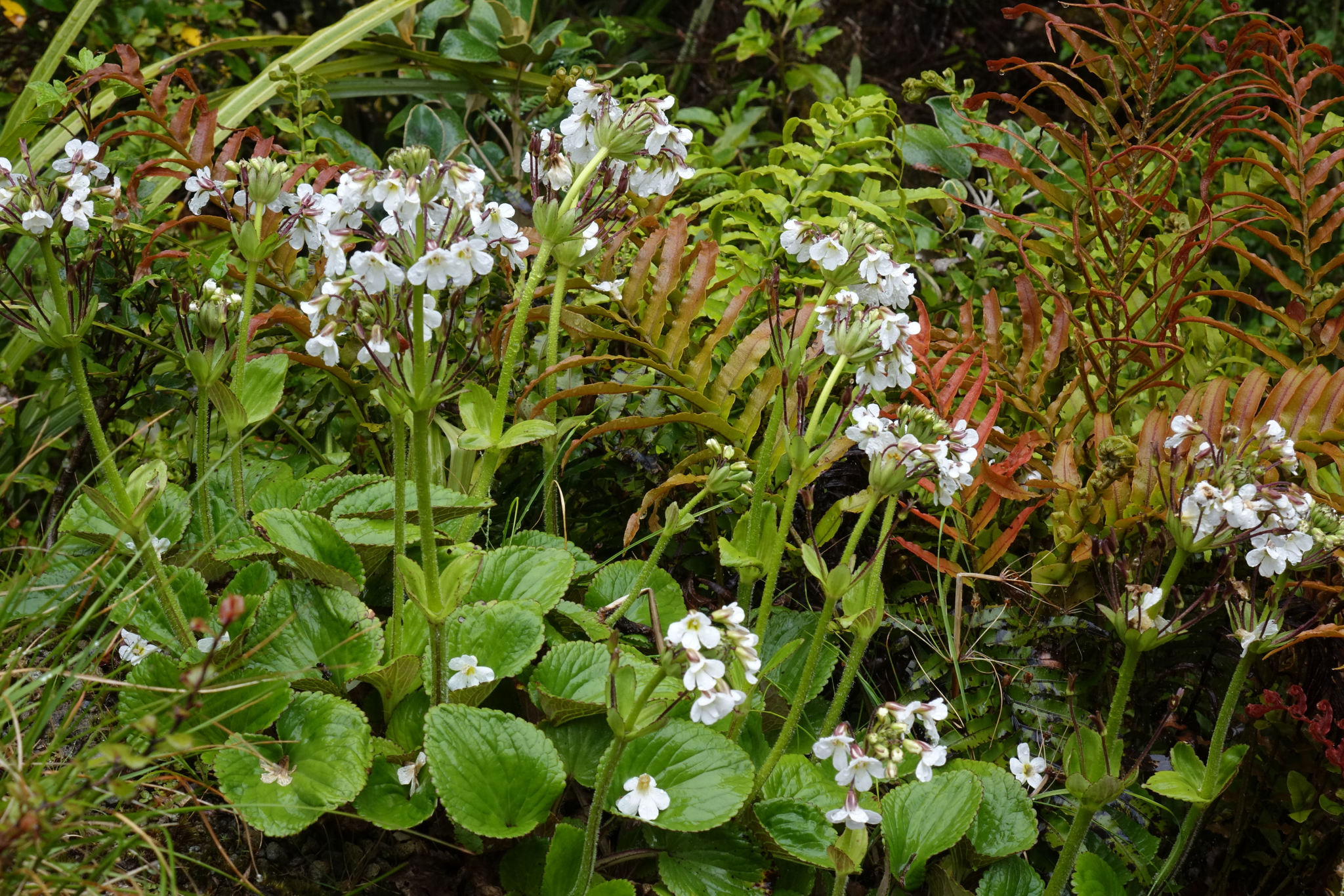
Ourisia macrophylla in its native habitat

Ourisia macrophylla is endemic to New Zealand. O. macrophylla subsp. macrophylla is found on the North Island (in Gisborne, Volcanic Plateau, Waikato, Taranaki, and southern North Island) and O. macrophylla subsp. lactea is found on the South Island (in Western Nelson, Marlborough, Canterbury, and Westland). This species is usually found below the bushline, in damp to wet sheltered areas in Nothofagus forest, near cliffs, tracks, streams or waterfalls, or sometimes just above bushline in partly shaded to open subalpine scrub or tussuck, from 210 to 1,800 m (690 to 5,910 ft) above sea level. It can be very locally common.

== Phylogeny ==
Seven individuals of O. macrophylla were included in phylogenetic analyses of all species of the genus Ourisia using standard DNA sequencing markers (two nuclear ribosomal DNA markers and two chloroplast DNA regions) and morphological data. In all analyses, the sampled individuals belonged to the highly supported New Zealand lineage, and in the nuclear ribosomal and combined datasets, they were all very closely related to one another together and to O. vulcanica, as well as the other large-leaved species O. crosbyi and O. calycina.

In another phylogenetic study using amplified fragment length polymorphisms (AFLPs), 36 individuals were sampled of subsp. macrophylla (16) and subsp. lactea (20). O. macrophylla was monophyletic, and the two subspecies formed sister lineages, with moderate to high support in the phylogenetic analyses of AFLP data. O. macrophylla was part of a highly supported clade that was in a larger clade of other large-leaved species, i.e. O. macrocarpa, O. crosbyi, O. calycina and O. vulcanica. The 36 sampled individuals of O. macrophylla however did not comprise one of the significant clusters in the Bayesian clustering analysis, nor did either of the subspecies.

== Life history ==
The life history of O. macrophylla was studied in detail by Marie Taylor for her MSc thesis.

== Conservation status ==
Ourisia macrophylla is listed as Not Threatened in the most recent assessment (2017–2018) of the New Zealand Threatened Classification for plants.
