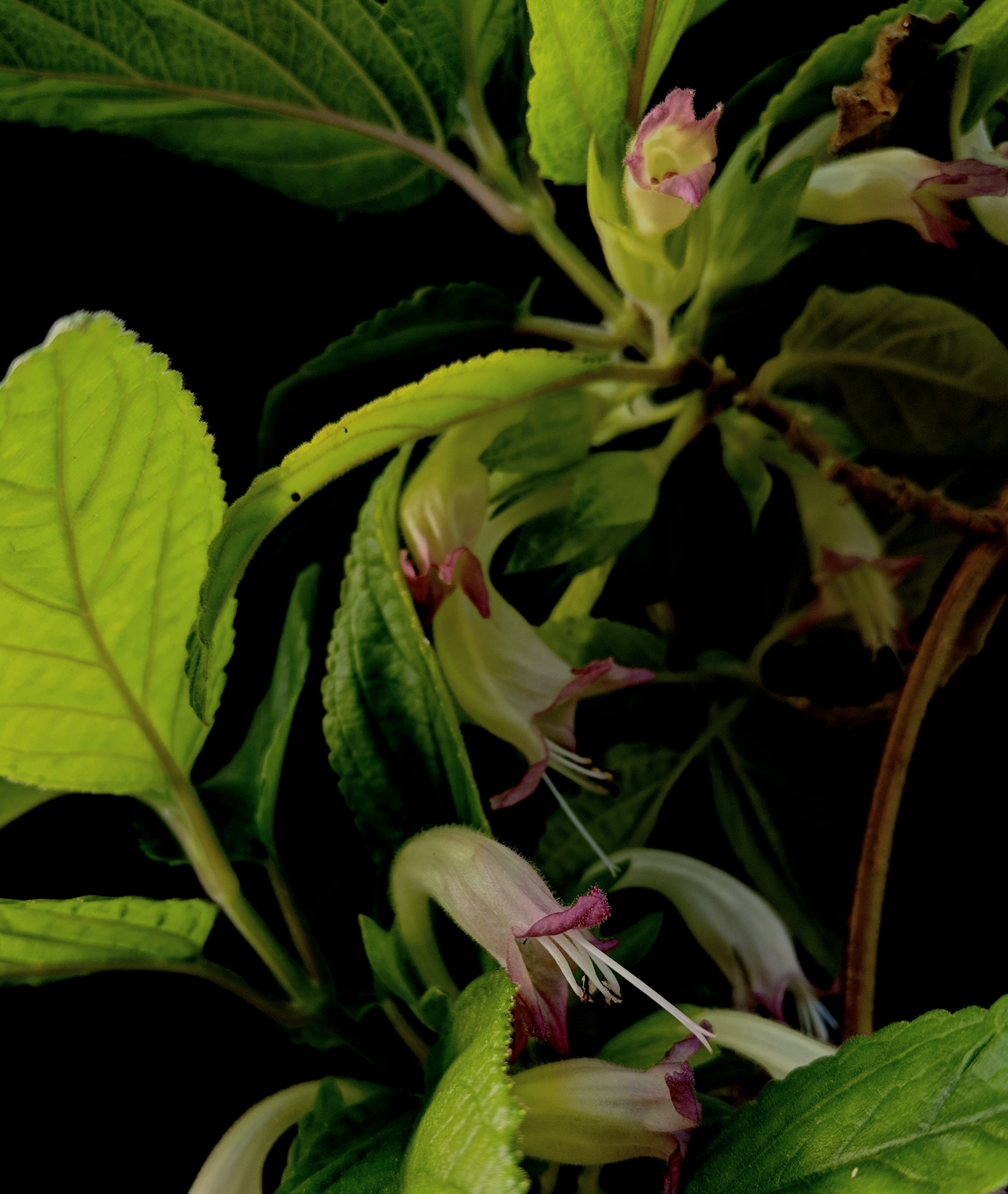

Conservation status
- Possibly Extinct (NatureServe)

- Critically endangered, possibly extinct in the wild (IUCN 3.1)

Scientific classification
- Kingdom: Plantae
- Clade: Tracheophytes
- Clade: Angiosperms
- Clade: Eudicots
- Clade: Asterids
- Order: Lamiales
- Family: Lamiaceae
- Genus: Stenogyne
- Species: S. kanehoana

Binomial name
- Stenogyne kanehoana O. Deg. & Sherff

= Stenogyne kanehoana =

Species of flowering plant

Stenogyne kanehoana is a rare species of flowering plant in the mint family known by the common name Oahu stenogyne. It is endemic to Hawaii, where it is known only from the Waianae Range on the island of Oahu. It is a federally listed endangered species of the United States.

This plant was feared extinct when the last known individuals died in 1996. Six plants were discovered in 2000, but by 2005 these were also dead. As of 2004 there was only a single individual remaining in the wild, a very large plant spanning over four meters which may actually be more than one individual growing together. Cuttings have been collected from this plant.

This Hawaiian mint is a woolly vine which can reach 1 or 2 meters in length. The woolly leaves are up to 14 centimeters long by 4.8 wide. The plant produces tubular flowers which may be over 4 centimeters long. They are white or yellowish with purple-pink lips. The plant reproduces vegetatively, rooting where the stems contact the substrate and growing up new, cloned plants.
