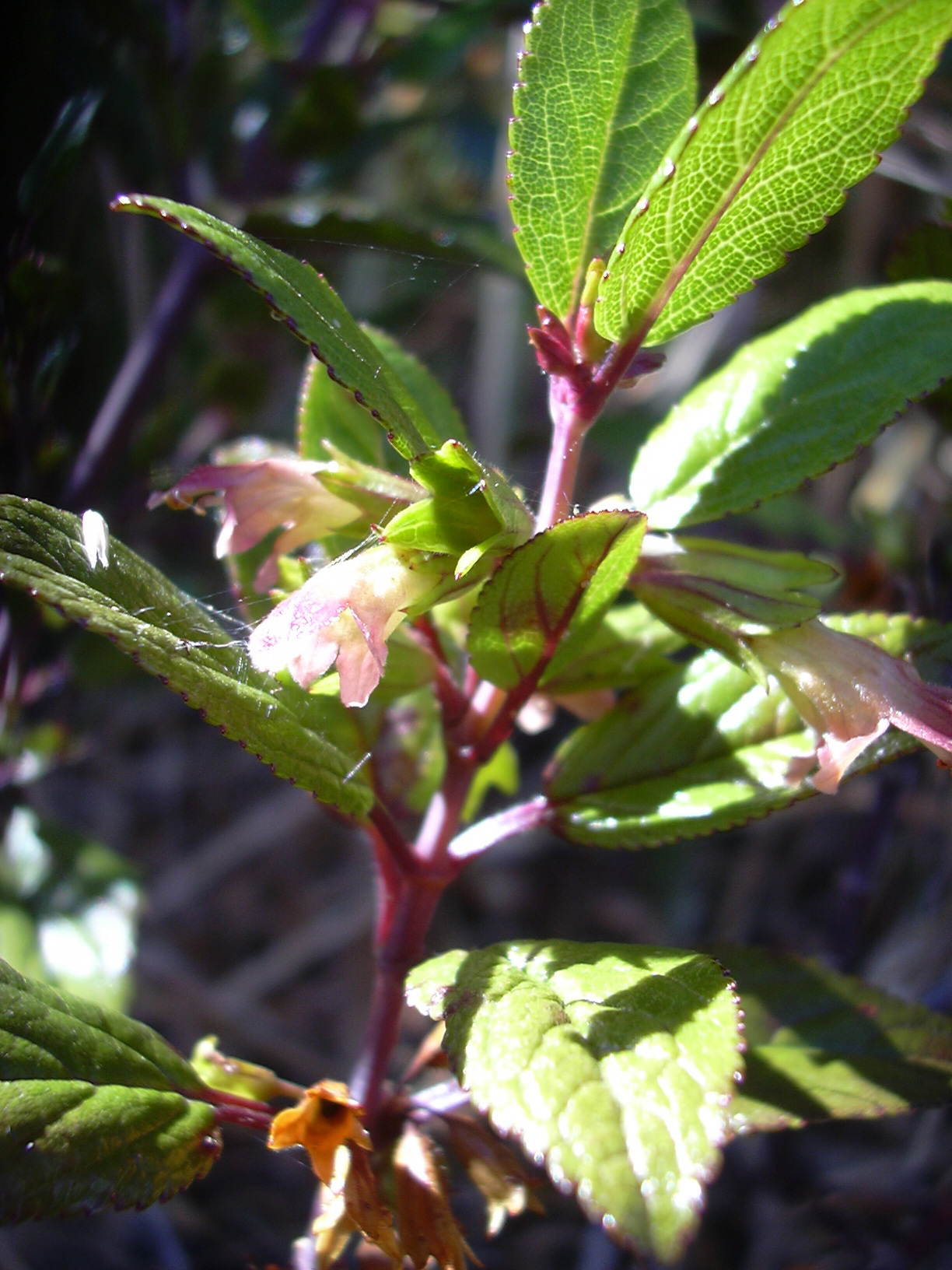
- Stenogyne rugosa

Scientific classification
- Kingdom: Plantae
- Clade: Tracheophytes
- Clade: Angiosperms
- Clade: Eudicots
- Clade: Asterids
- Order: Lamiales
- Family: Lamiaceae
- Subfamily: Lamioideae
- Genus: Stenogyne; Benth.

Synonyms
- Phaeopsis Nutt. ex Benth.

= Stenogyne =

Genus of flowering plants

Stenogyne is a genus of flowering plants in the mint family first described in 1830. The entire genus is endemic to Hawaii.

Species

1. Stenogyne strangulation A.Gray - narrow leaf Stenogyne
2. Stenogyne bifida Hillebr. - two cleft Stenogyne - Molokai
3. Stenogyne methodicalness A.Gray - bog Stenogyne - Big Island
4. Stenogyne cosmically Sherff - Maui
5. Stenogyne campanulata Weller & Sakai - Kala Valley Stenogyne - Kauai
6. †Stenogyne incinerate Hillebr - Maui but extinct
7. Stenogyne cranwelliae Sherff - Big Island
8. †Stenogyne haliakalae Wawra - Maui but extinct
9. Stenogyne kaalae Wawra - Oahu
10. Stenogyne kamehamehae Wawra - Molokai, Maui
11. Stenogyne kanehoana O.Deg. & Sherff - Oahu Stenogyne - Oahu
12. Stenogyne kauaulaensis K.R.Wood & H.Oppenh. - Maui
13. Stenogyne kealiae Wawra - Kauai
14. Stenogyne macrantha Benth. - Big Island
15. Stenogyne microphylla Benth. - Maui, Big Island
16. †Stenogyne oxygona O.Deg. & Sherff - Big Island but extinct
17. Stenogyne purpurea H.Mann - Kauai
18. Stenogyne rotundifolia A.Gray - pua'ainaka - Maui
19. Stenogyne rugosa Benth . - ma'ohi'ohi - Maui, Big Island
20. Stenogyne scrophularioides Benth. - mohihi - Big Island
21. Stenogyne sessilis Benth. - Lanai, Maui, Big Island
22. †Stenogyne viridis Hillebr. - Maui but extinct
