= Stenogyne kealiae =

Conservation status
- Critically Imperiled (NatureServe)

Scientific classification
- Kingdom: Plantae
- Clade: Tracheophytes
- Clade: Angiosperms
- Clade: Eudicots
- Clade: Asterids
- Order: Lamiales
- Family: Lamiaceae
- Genus: Stenogyne
- Species: S. kealiae

Binomial name
- Stenogyne kealiae Wawra

Species of flowering plant

Stenogyne kealiae is a rare species of flowering plant in the mint family known by the common name Keal's stenogyne. It is endemic to Hawaii, where it is known only from the island of Kauai. It was federally listed as an endangered species of the United States in 2010.

This plant is a vine with lance-shaped leaves up to 15 centimeters long. The flowers are purple-pink in color.

There are 5 populations remaining on Kauai, for a total of no more than about 200 individuals. Threats to the plant include feral ungulates such as feral pigs, goats, and mule deer, as well as introduced plant species such as daisy fleabane (Erigeron karvinskianus).
