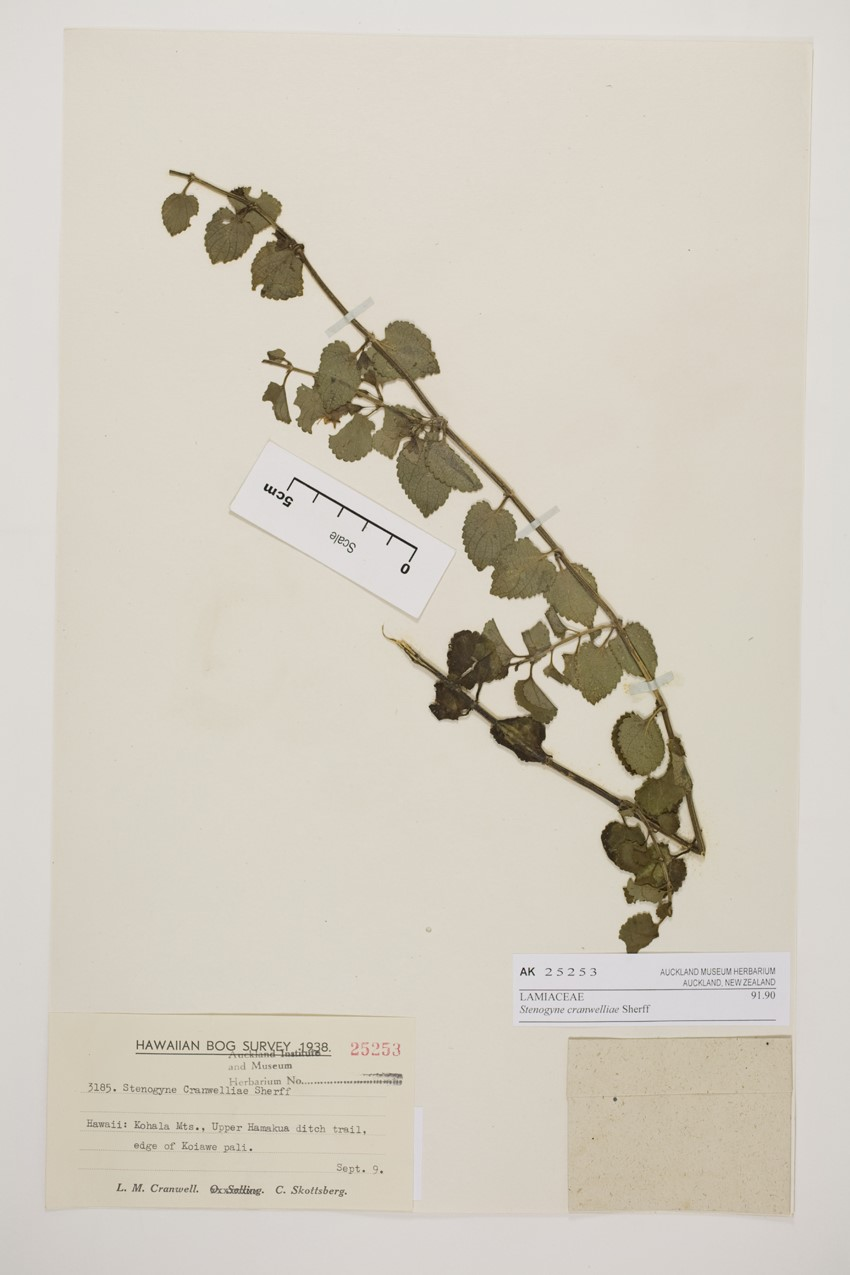
- Syntype of Stenogyne cranwelliae from the collections of Auckland War Memorial Museum

Conservation status
- Critically Imperiled (NatureServe)

Scientific classification
- Kingdom: Plantae
- Clade: Tracheophytes
- Clade: Angiosperms
- Clade: Eudicots
- Clade: Asterids
- Order: Lamiales
- Family: Lamiaceae
- Genus: Stenogyne
- Species: S. cranwelliae

Binomial name
- Stenogyne cranwelliae Sherff

Synonyms
- Stenogyne bracteosa H.St.John; Stenogyne repens H.St.John

= Stenogyne cranwelliae =

Species of plant

Stenogyne cranwelliae, also known as Kohala Mountain stenogyne, is a flowering plant the family Lamiaceae. The plant is endemic to Hawaii.

== Taxonomy and naming ==
The species was first formally described in 1939 by Earl Edward Sherff, based on specimens collected from Waipio Valley in Kohala, Hawaii in 1938. Sherff named the species after Auckland War Memorial Museum botanist Lucy Cranwell, who was one of the three people who collected the specimen. Stenogyne bracteosa and Stenogyne repens, both described by Harold St. John in 1987, have since been synonymised with S. cranwelliae.

Phylogenetic analysis of Hawaiian mints has shown that S. cranwelliae is closelyt related to S. calaminthoides, S. macrantha, S. sessilis and S. rugosa.

== Description ==
Stenogyne cranwelliae has elongated stems which measure approximately 1.5–2.5 mm (0.059–0.098 in) in thickness. It is morphologically similar to S. calaminthoides, but differs by having significantly smaller leaf petioles and a different leaf shape. It grows as a creeping vine, and grows groups of six flowers.

== Habitat and range ==
The species is endemic to Hawaii, uncommonly found in wet forested areas.
