= Stenogyne bifida =

Conservation status
- Critically Imperiled (NatureServe)

- Critically endangered, possibly extinct in the wild (IUCN 3.1)

Scientific classification
- Kingdom: Plantae
- Clade: Tracheophytes
- Clade: Angiosperms
- Clade: Eudicots
- Clade: Asterids
- Order: Lamiales
- Family: Lamiaceae
- Genus: Stenogyne
- Species: S. bifida

Binomial name
- Stenogyne bifida Hillebr.

Species of flowering plant

Stenogyne bifida is a rare species of flowering plant in the mint family known by the common name twocleft stenogyne. It is endemic to Hawaii, where it is known only from the island of Molokai. In 2010, there was only a single individual remaining in the wild; this is a seedling. It is a federally listed endangered species of the United States.

This plant is a climbing, trailing perennial vine. It produces yellow-green to brownish flowers. It grows in disturbed forest habitat dominated by Metrosideros polymorpha. The area has a large population of feral pigs that damage the habitat. The plant also faces competition from introduced plant species such as molasses grass, holly fern, thimbleberry and Christmasberry.
