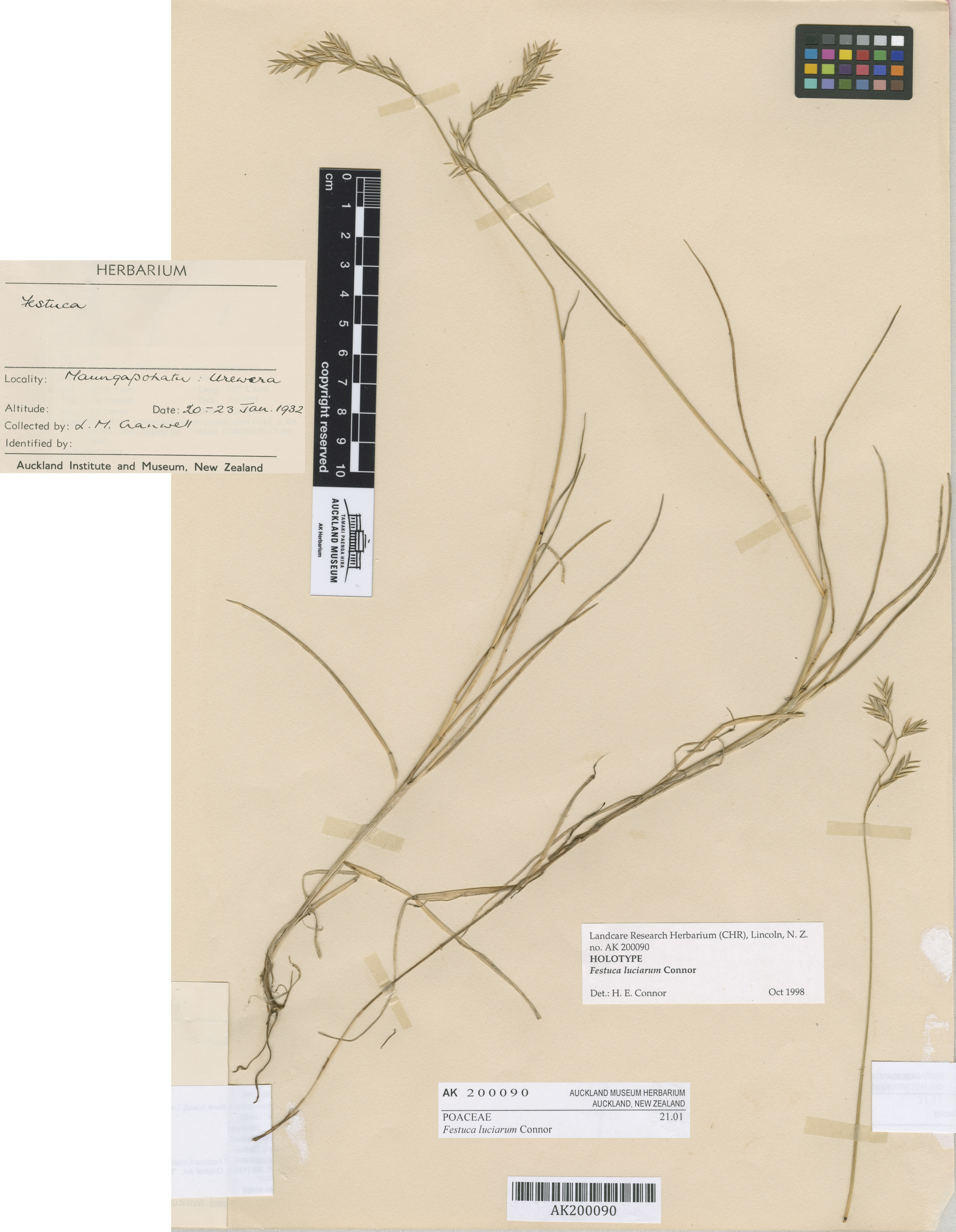
- Holotype from the Auckland War Memorial Museum Herbarium

Conservation status
- Data Deficient (NZ TCS)

Scientific classification
- Kingdom: Plantae
- Clade: Tracheophytes
- Clade: Angiosperms
- Clade: Monocots
- Clade: Commelinids
- Order: Poales
- Family: Poaceae
- Subfamily: Pooideae
- Genus: Festuca
- Species: F. luciarum

Binomial name
- Festuca luciarum Connor

= Festuca luciarum =

Species of grass in New Zealand

Festuca luciarum is a species of grass in the family Poaceae. It is endemic to New Zealand, found in the eastern North Island at higher altitudes.

== Taxonomy and naming ==
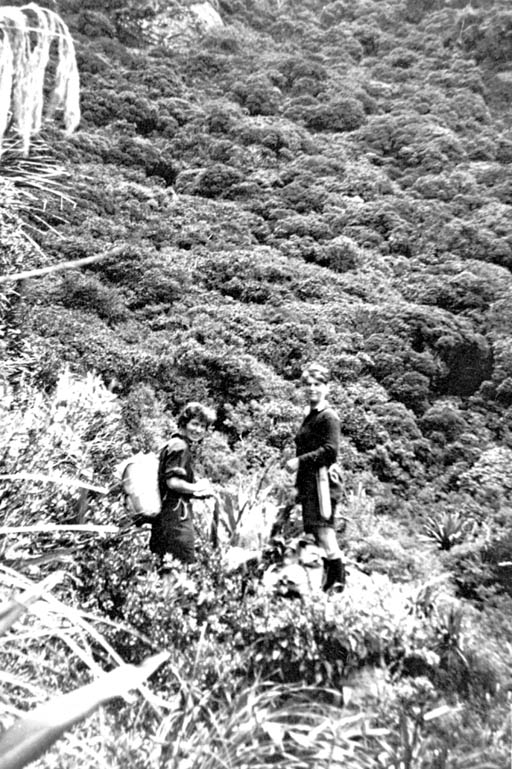
Lucy Cranwell and Lucy Moore on their field trip to Maungapohatu in 1932

The species was first formally described in 1998 by Henry Connor, based on specimens collected by botanists Lucy Cranwell and Lucy Moore from Maungapohatu in Te Urewera in 1932. Connor named the species after both Cranwell and Moore.

The species is closely related to the species Festuca coxii, Festuca multinodis and Festuca ultramafica, which form the Neozeylandic clade II of Loliinae grasses.

== Description ==
F. luciarum is a tall stoloniferous grass with long shoots that have dark violet inflorescences. There are morphological differences between different members based on which geographically separated area they are found in.

== Habitat and range ==
The species is endemic to New Zealand, found in the inland areas of the eastern North Island, at an elevation of between 900–1,500 m (3,000–4,900 ft).

== Conservation status ==
The species is listed as At Risk - Naturally Uncommon in the most recent assessment (2023) of the New Zealand Threatened Classification for plants. This status is a change from the At Risk - Naturally Uncommon listing in the 2017 assessment.

In addition to qualifiers RR ("Range restricted"), and Sp ("Biologically sparse"), F. luciarum also has the qualifier CI ("Climate impact"). The CI qualifier has been used by the Department of Conservation since 2021 to flag species in its conservation assessments that are "adversely affected by long-term climate trends and/or extreme climatic events."
