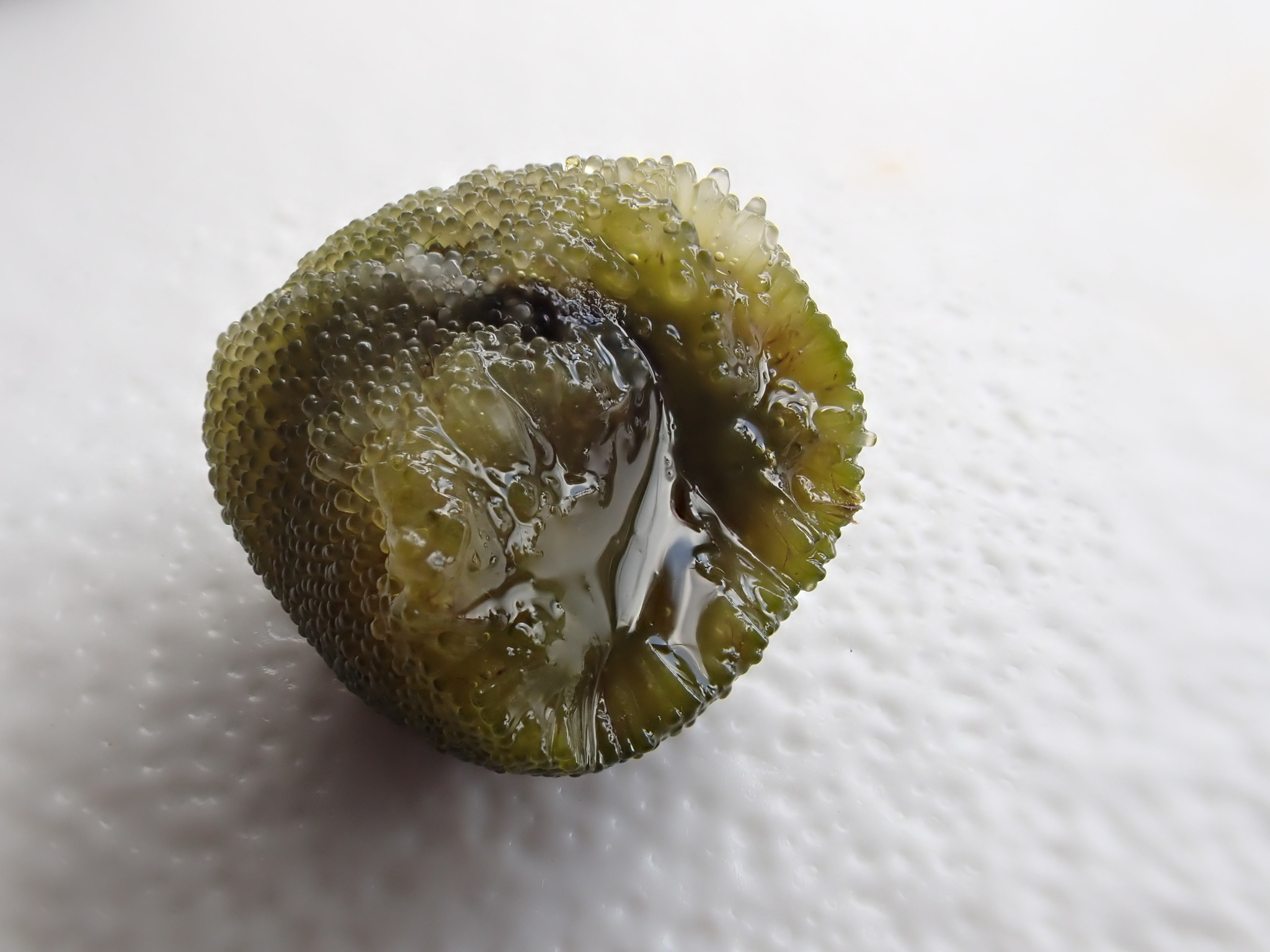
- Codium cranwelliae found at North Cape, New Zealand

Conservation status
- Naturally Uncommon (NZ TCS)

Scientific classification
- Kingdom: Plantae
- Division: Chlorophyta
- Class: Ulvophyceae
- Order: Bryopsidales
- Family: Codiaceae
- Genus: Codium
- Species: C. cranwelliae

Binomial name
- Codium cranwelliae Setch.

= Codium cranwelliae =

Species of green algae

Codium cranwelliae is a subtidal seaweed in the family Codiaceae. The green algae is endemic to New Zealand, primary found on the northeastern coast of the North Island.

== Taxonomy and naming ==
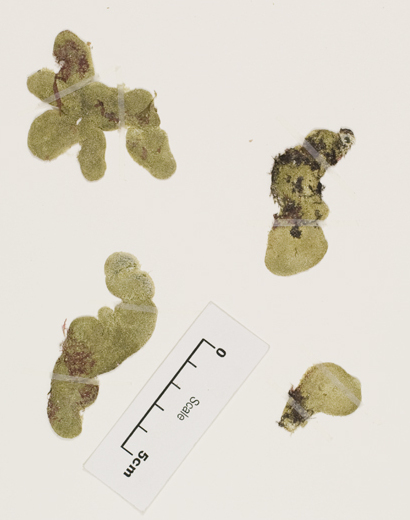
Specimen from the collections of Auckland War Memorial Museum

The species was first formally described in 1940 by William Albert Setchell, based on specimens collected by botanist Lucy Cranwell from the Poor Knights Islands in February 1937. Setchell named the species after Cranwell.

== Description ==
C. cranwelliae has a light green colour, and distinctive oval branching utricles attached to a narrow base. These utricles can be up to 6–7 mm (0.24–0.28 in) long.

== Habitat and range ==
The species is endemic to New Zealand, found in subtidal coastal areas. It has been found as far south at the Mahia Peninsula.
