= Stenogyne campanulata =

Conservation status
- Critically endangered, possibly extinct in the wild (IUCN 3.1)

- Critically Imperiled (NatureServe)

Scientific classification
- Kingdom: Plantae
- Clade: Tracheophytes
- Clade: Angiosperms
- Clade: Eudicots
- Clade: Asterids
- Order: Lamiales
- Family: Lamiaceae
- Genus: Stenogyne
- Species: S. campanulata

Binomial name
- Stenogyne campanulata Weller & Sakai

Species of flowering plant

Stenogyne campanulata is a rare species of flowering plant in the mint family known by the common name Kalalau Valley stenogyne. It is endemic to Hawaii, where it is known only from the Kalalau Valley on the island of Kauai. It is a federally listed endangered species of the United States.

This plant was first discovered in 1986 growing on a Kalalau Valley cliff in Na Pali Coast State Park, and it was described to science as a new species in 1989. As of 2006 there was only a single population containing about 50 individuals. The plant is threatened by habitat degradation caused by feral pigs and introduced plant species such as air plant (Kalanchoe pinnata).
