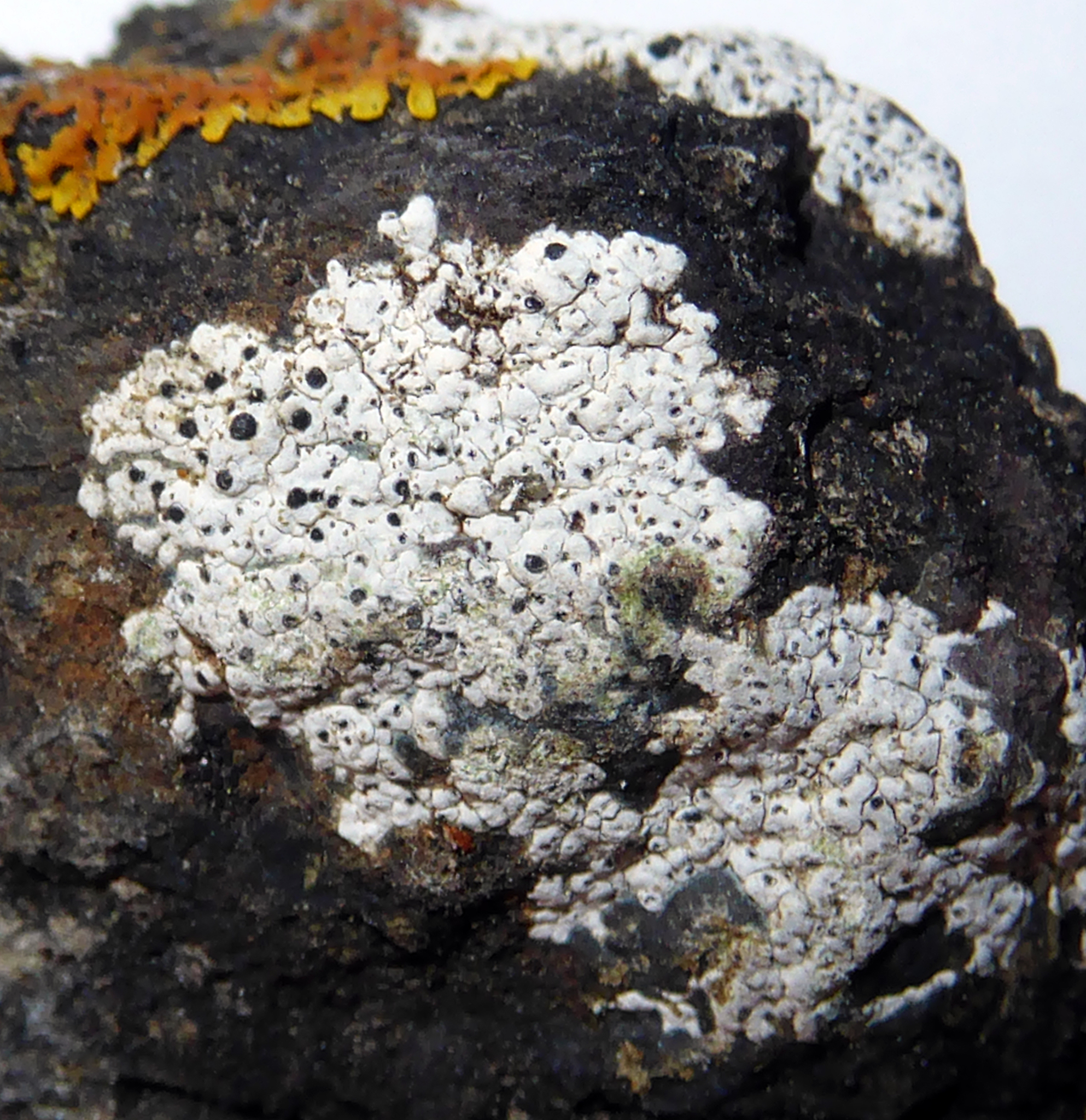
- Buellia cranwelliae growing on a rock found at North Cape, New Zealand

Conservation status
- Naturally Uncommon (NZ TCS)

Scientific classification
- Domain: Eukaryota
- Kingdom: Fungi
- Division: Ascomycota
- Class: Lecanoromycetes
- Order: Caliciales
- Family: Caliciaceae
- Genus: Buellia
- Species: B. cranwelliae

Binomial name
- Buellia cranwelliae Zahlbr.

Synonyms
- Buellia (Eubucllia) Cranwellii Zahlbr.

= Buellia cranwelliae =

Species of lichen

Buellia cranwelliae, is a coastal buellioid lichen in the family Caliciaceae. It is found on rock substrates in coastal areas in New Zealand, as well as areas of eastern Australia.

== Taxonomy and naming ==
The lichen was first formally described under the name Buellia (Eubucllia) Cranwellii in 1847 by Alexander Zahlbruckner. The type was collected by botanist Lucy Cranwell from Anawhata in West Auckland, New Zealand in 1933. Zahlbruckner named the species after Cranwell.

== Description ==
B. cranwelliae lives on rock and has a chalky white opaque appearance. It has a white crustose thallus which lacks lichen substances, and a white medulla containing calcium oxalate.

== Habitat and range ==
B. cranwelliae is widespread across New Zealand, found on coastal rocks of both the North Island and South Island. It was thought to be endemic to New Zealand until 2016, after which the species has been found on Norfolk Island, eastern Australia and Tasmania. Additionally, the species is known to occur in the Kermadec Islands and Chatham Islands of new Zealand.

== Gallery ==
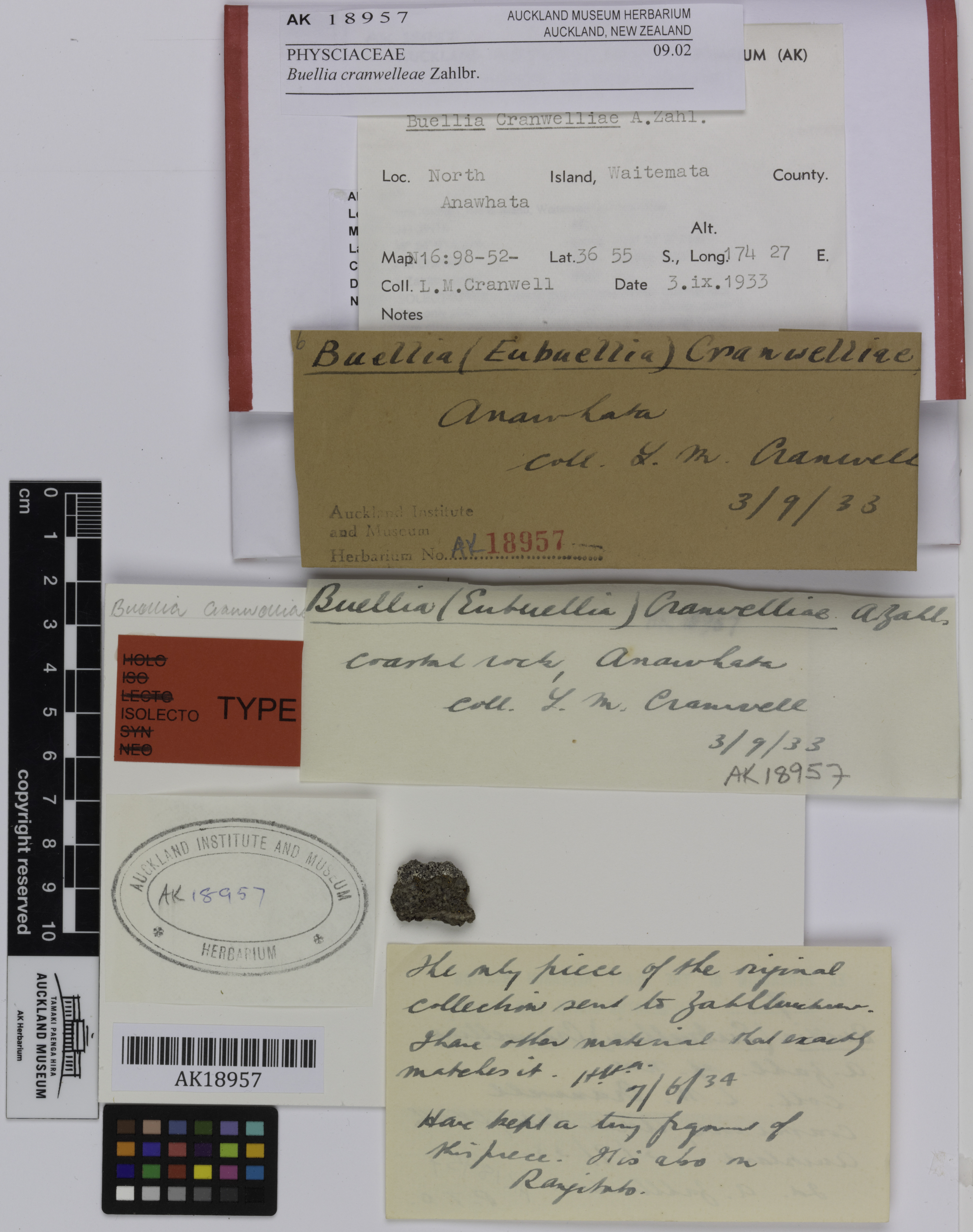
Isolectotype of Buellia cranwelliae, including handwritten field notes by the species' namesake Lucy Cranwell

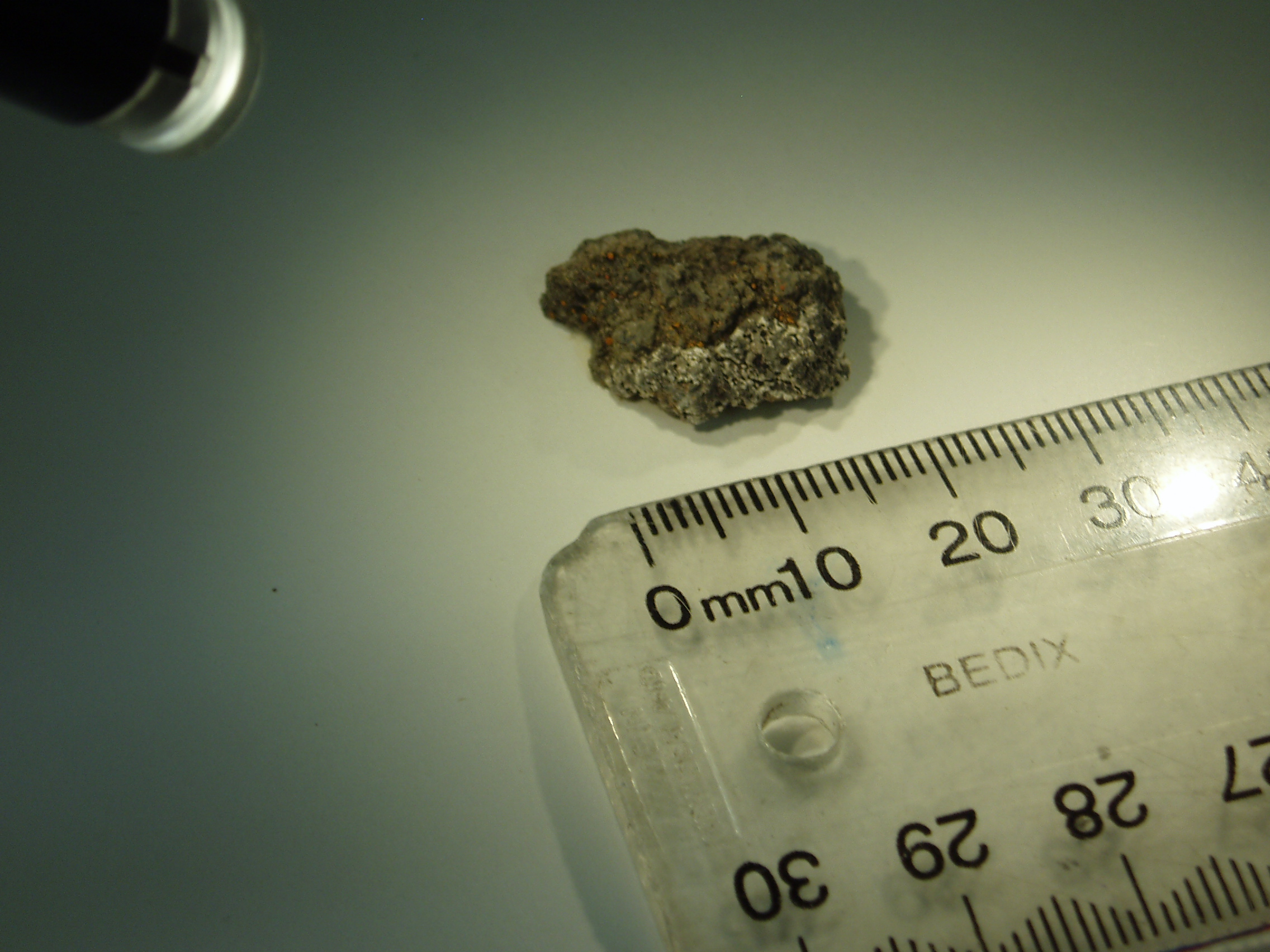
Isolectotype of Buellia cranwelliae

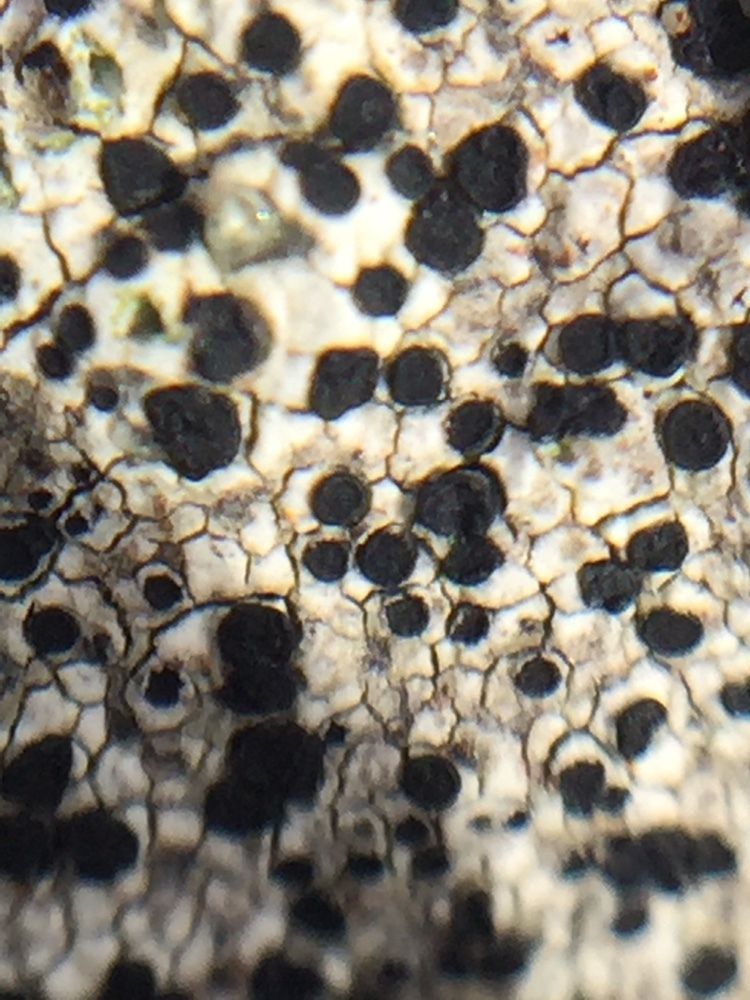
Magnified view of Buellia cranwelliae
