= Lucy Cranwell =

New Zealand botanist (1907-2000)

Lucy Cranwell FRSNZ
- Cranwell, c. 1930s
- Born: 7 August 1907; Henderson, New Zealand
- Died: 8 June 2000 (aged 92); Tucson, Arizona, U.S.
- Education: University of Auckland
- Known for: Palynology; flora of New Zealand
- Scientific career
- Fields: Botany; palynology
- Workplaces: Auckland Museum, University of Arizona
- Author abbrev. (botany): Cranwell

Lucy May Cranwell FRSNZ (7 August 1907 – 8 June 2000) was a New Zealand botanist responsible for groundbreaking work in palynology. Cranwell was appointed curator of botany at Auckland Museum in 1929, when she was 21 years old. As well as her work on ancient pollen samples she was responsible for encouraging a love of botany in a generation of Auckland children.

== Early life and education ==
Cranwell was born in Auckland, New Zealand, in 1907. She grew up in Henderson, on an orchard at the conjunction of the Ōpanuku and Oratia streams. Cranwell states her initial interest in science and botany was supported by Henry Charles Swan. Swan had a small orchard in Henderson and experimented with propagation to combat orchard pests. She was strongly influenced by her conservation-minded and artistic mother. It has been suggested that Cranwell inherited the unpredictable aspects of her fearless and adventuresome spirit from her mother's Cornish roots. Her father was a trained nurseryman who had planted an extensive orchard in the family property. She attended Henderson public school, and attended Epsom Girls Grammar School from 1921 to 1923. She entered the University of Auckland in 1925 where she undertook an initial BA degree that was a mixture of English and botany, followed by a master's in botany with a thesis on the epiphytes of the Waitākere Ranges. She graduated in 1929.

During her university studies she developed a love of tramping and gained a reputation as talented, in the University Field Club. Her love of the New Zealand wilderness stood her in good stead for the many botany field trips she began to embark on, most often with fellow botany student and friend Lucy Moore, to various remote and inaccessible parts of the country.

== Auckland Museum ==
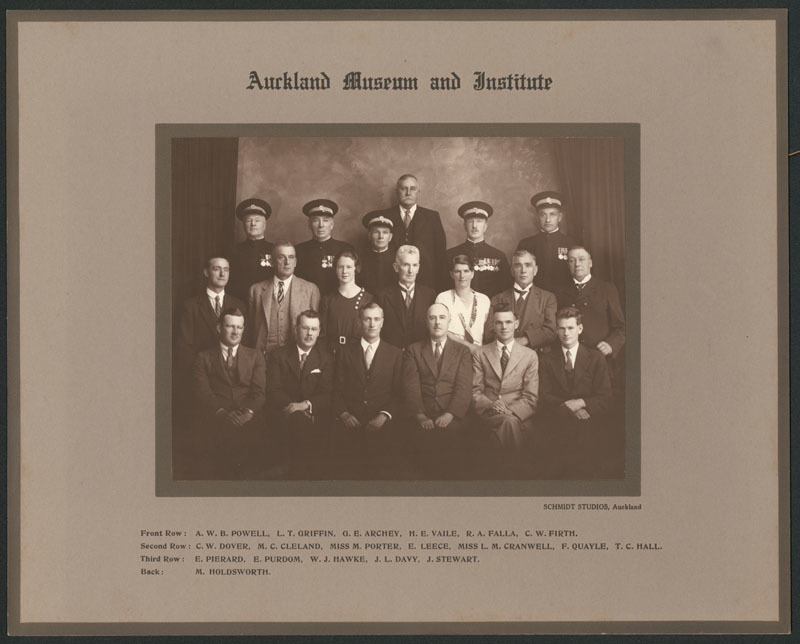
Lucy Cranwell in group portrait of Auckland Museum staff circa 1930s

In April 1929, a few weeks after graduating, the director of the Auckland Museum, Dr Gilbert Edward Archey, offered Cranwell the inaugural Botany Curator position. The museum was due to open in its new, much larger, war memorial building in November of that year and its halls were in need of filling with displays. "Everything had to be done on a shoestring, alas, and there was no artist to help make the cases look seductive for man, woman, or child. People did not seem to take notice, however. Dr Archey had stressed that we were to consider ourselves the servants of the public; we were to welcome enquiries of all kinds," wrote Cranwell of those first few months in the job.

As well as finding botanical specimens for display she also set about organising the Cheeseman herbarium of about 10,000 specimens. During her 14 years as botany curator she introduced "botany trots" for children to places like Rangitoto Island in the Hauraki Gulf, wrote weekly short articles for children about plants for the Auckland Star newspaper, and collected over 4000 plants for the herbarium during her 14 years as the botanist.

== Field work ==
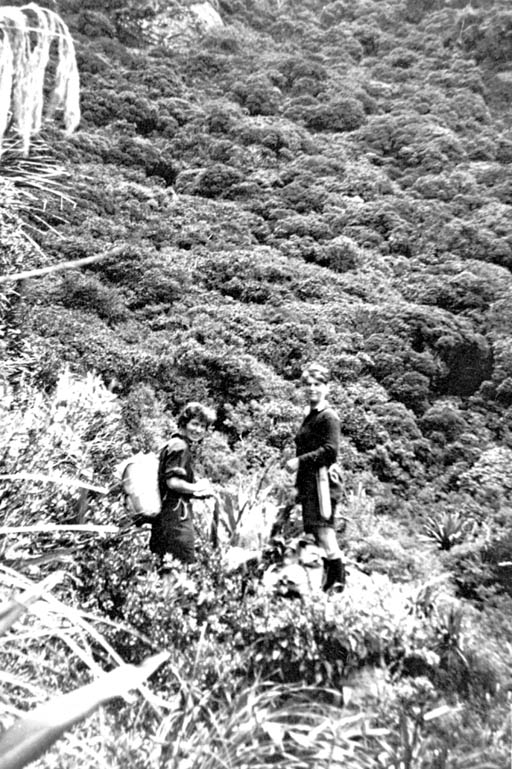
Lucy Moore and Lucy Cranwell at Maungapohatu, 1932

Cranwell's field work was among the first and certainly the most extensive undertaken by a woman scientist in New Zealand. These included trips into the pristine, ancient podocarp forests of the King Country looking for root parasites, various trips to Te Moehau peak on the tip of the Coromandel peninsula where she documented the unique alpine flora found there, and several visits to Maungapohatu in Te Urewera. She also undertook a study of marine algae of New Zealand's northern islands (a green and a red algae are named after her), surveys of Auckland Harbour and its west coast between Muriwai and Piha, as well as several trips to take fossil pollen samples from South Island bogs.

Field trips in the 1920s and 1930s were tough assignments. Cranwell and her botanical companion Lucy Moore often slept out in the open in canvas sleeping bags, occasionally waking up covered in frost. Her field experience led her to be a conservationist recognising early that possums and wallabies represented a serious threat to the biodiversity of New Zealand forests. In 1940, Cranwell published The Botany of Auckland, the first definitive work of flora in the Auckland Region.

== Palynology ==
During a trip to Europe, which included attending the International Botanical Congress in Amsterdam in 1935, she was invited by Professor Lennart von Post of Stockholm to learn his method of fossil pollen analysis. With knowledge of this new field study, palynology, Cranwell opened up a whole new field of botany in New Zealand. Her work analysing pollen taken from the sediment in bogs revealed the past botanical assemblages in New Zealand and aided an understanding of New Zealand's past as part of the supercontinent of Gondwana.

In 1937, Cranwell became a founding member of the Auckland Botanical Society. She was made a Fellow of the Linnaean Society (London) in November 1937, "in recognition of botanical research work done both in New Zealand and Sweden and because of efforts she has made to stimulate interest in botany through her position at the Auckland Museum." In the same year she won New Zealand's premier conservation award, the Loder Cup.

== War effort ==
Cranwell's war effort during World War II was to research to and prepare a booklet for downed allied airmen called Food Is Where You Find It: A Guide to Emergency Foods of the Western Pacific. It detailed, with illustrations, what fish and foods the downed pilots with could eat. The booklet proved extremely popular and five facsimile impressions followed the initial print run of 5,000 copies. Cranwell also recommended to the Ministry of Works that wattle trees, pampas grass and nasturtiums should be planted across New Zealand as emergency rations and stock feed.

== Marriage and later life ==
On 30 September 1943, Cranwell married Captain (later Major) Samuel Watson Smith (1897–1993) of the United States 13th Air Force, a lawyer and later eminent researcher in archaeology, at St Andrew's First Presbyterian Church. In February 1944, Cranwell resigned from the Auckland War Memorial Museum, and moved to Orlando, Florida, with her husband. The family moved to Cambridge, Massachusetts, in 1944, where Smith worked at the Peabody Museum of Archaeology and Ethnology and Cranwell as a research associate in the Botany Department of Harvard University. The family's son Benjamin Smith was born in Boston on 19 March 1947.

The family moved to Tucson, Arizona in 1950, where Cranwell became a Research Affiliate in palynology at the University of Arizona. She earned international recognition for her work in this field, particularly on Gondwanan plant microfossils. Cranwell held this position for the rest of her life.

Even after moving to the United States, Cranwell remained strongly interested in New Zealand flora, and often returned to Auckland. She was awarded the Hector Medal from the Royal Society of New Zealand in 1954, the first woman ever to receive this honour, and in 1973 became one of the first patrons of the Waitākere Ranges Protection Society.

== Recognition ==
Lucy May Cranwell Smith was elected as a Fellow of the Royal Society of New Zealand in 1944, and was the second woman to receive this award. In 1992, Cranwell was awarded an Honorary Doctor of Science by the University of Auckland, and in 1999 became a Fellow of Auckland War Memorial Museum.

In 2017, Cranwell was selected as one of the Royal Society Te Apārangi's "150 women in 150 words", celebrating the contributions of women to knowledge in New Zealand.

== Legacy ==
The New Zealand Association of Scientists Cranwell Medal is awarded to a practising scientist for excellence in communicating science to the general public in any area of science or technology. In 2017 this medal was renamed from the Science Communicator Medal to honour Cranwell, a remarkable communicator of science – in a time when this was essentially unheard of. The inaugural winner was the physicist Ocean Mercier.

Cranwell's childhood home in Henderson, which was bought by her father from Thomas Henderson, was donated to Waitakere City by the Cranwell family, and is now the location of Cranwell Park. A tramping track at Anawhata on the west coast of the Waitākere Ranges, which Cranwell was a passionate advocate for, is named after Cranwell.

Numerous species have been named after Cranwell, including New Zealand native species such as Libertia cranwelliae, the seaweed Codium cranwelliae, and the lichen Buellia cranwelliae, the binomial name for the New Zealand sand diver (Tewara cranwellae), and the Hawaiian endemic plant Stenogyne cranwelliae. The New Zealand native grass species Festuca luciarum was named after both her and Lucy Moore. In addition, several fossil pollen genera and species have been named in Cranwell's honour, including Cranwellia, Cranwellipollis and Nothofagidites cranwellae.

== Selected bibliography ==
- Cranwell, L. M.; Moore, L. B. (1935). "Botanical Notes on the Hen and Chickens Islands". Records of the Auckland Institute and Museum. 1: 301–318. ISSN 0067-0464. JSTOR 42905959. OCLC 947984821. Wikidata Q58676572.
- Cranwell, Lucy M.; von Post, Lennart (October 1936). "Post-Pleistocene Pollen Diagrams from the Southern Hemisphere". Geografiska Annaler. 18 (3–4): 308–347. doi:10.1080/20014422.1936.11880619. ISSN 1651-3215. OCLC 156791175. Wikidata Q119546870.
- Cranwell, Lucy M. (1939). "Southern-Beech Pollens". Records of the Auckland Institute and Museum. 2: 175–196. ISSN 0067-0464. JSTOR 42905981. OCLC 1390245988. Wikidata Q58676610.
- Cranwell, Lucy M. (1942). "New Zealand Pollen Studies: 1. Key to the Pollen Grains of Families and Genera in the Native Flora". Records of the Auckland Institute and Museum. 2: 280–308. ISSN 0067-0464. JSTOR 42905990. OCLC 156791114. Wikidata Q58676623.
- Cranwell, L. M.; Green, J. E.; Powell, A. W. B. (1943), Food Is Where You Find It: a Guide to Emergency Foods of the Western Pacific, Auckland Institute and Museum, OCLC 1345224899, Wikidata Q115613964
- Cranwell, Lucy M. (1952). "New Zealand Pollen Studies: the Monocotyledons". Bulletin of the Auckland Institute and Museum. 3. Auckland Institute and Museum. ISSN 0067-0456. OCLC 214763426. Wikidata Q115110335.
- Cookson, Isabel C.; Cranwell, Lucy M. (April 1967). "Lower Tertiary Microplankton, Spores and Pollen Grains from Southernmost Chile". Micropaleontology. 13 (2): 204–216. doi:10.2307/1484671. ISSN 0026-2803. Wikidata Q99653289.
- Wall, A.; Cranwell, Lucy M. (1981), The Botany of Auckland (3rd ed.), Auckland: Auckland Institute and Museum, OCLC 8708383, Wikidata Q115614522

== See also ==
- Timeline of women in science
