= Lucy Moore (botanist) =

New Zealand botanist and ecologist (1906–1987)

Lucy Moore MBE
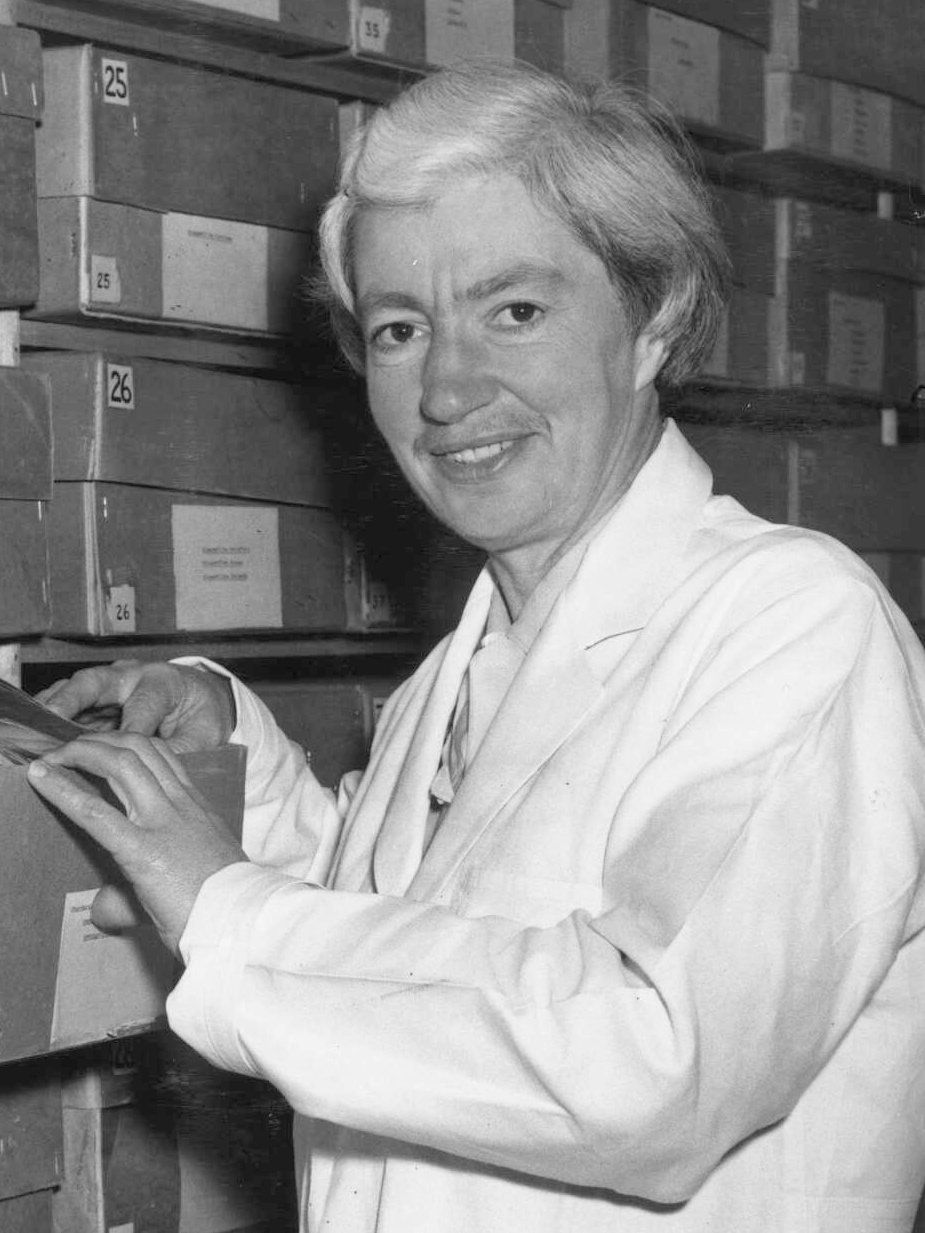
- Moore in 1959
- Born: Lucy Beatrice Moore; 14 July 1906; Warkworth, New Zealand
- Died: 9 June 1987 (aged 80); Orewa, New Zealand
- Education: Auckland University College
- Known for: Flora of New Zealand
- Scientific career
- Fields: Botany
- Workplaces: New Zealand Department of Scientific and Industrial Research (DSIR)

Lucy Beatrice Moore MBE, FLS (14 July 1906 – 9 June 1987) was a New Zealand botanist and ecologist.

== Biography ==
=== Early life and education ===
Moore was born in Warkworth, New Zealand, on 14 July 1906, the daughter of Janet Morison and Harry Blomfield Moore, and the grand-daughter of William and Frances Moore. William was also known as "Rainbow Will", from his gold prospecting days in the Coromandel area. Frances was a sister of Charles Blomfield, a well-known nineteenth-century New Zealand landscape painter. Moore's father was a local librarian and keen amateur naturalist. She went to primary school at Warkworth and then left home to attend Epsom Girls' Grammar school in Auckland. She won both a Junior and a Senior National Scholarship at Epsom Girls' as well as a University National Scholarship after enrolling as a student at Auckland University College in 1925. Moore's first significant piece of research was completed in the Coromandel region, north of her grand-father's gold claim. She met her lifelong friend, Lucy Cranwell, at Auckland University and together they enjoyed tramping. Moore graduated MSc with first-class honours in 1929 under the direction of the botanist T. L. Lancaster. Her thesis was on the root parasite Dactylanthus.

=== Career ===
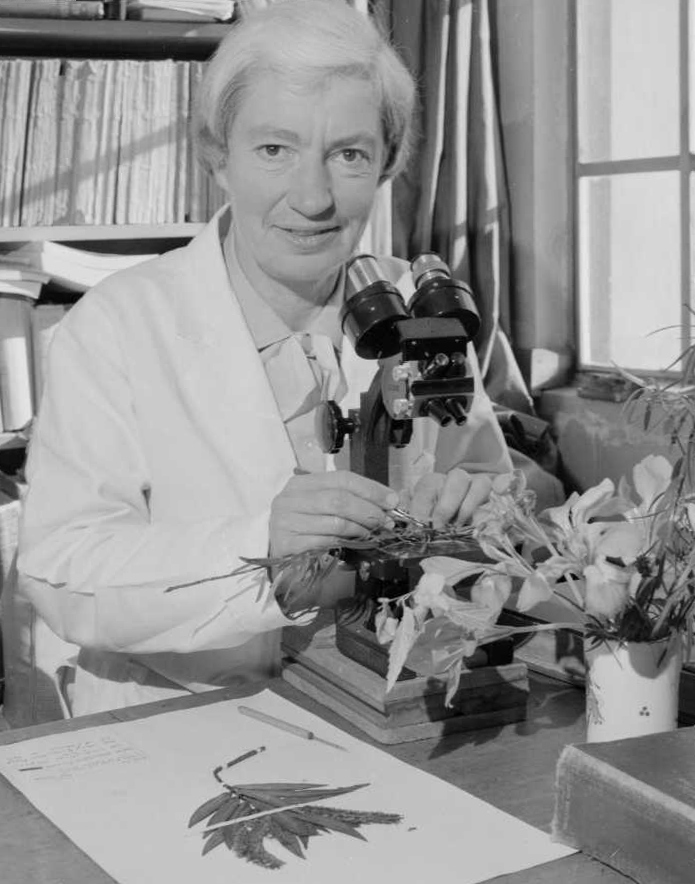
Moore at work in 1959

Moore was at first unsuccessful in her attempt to work as a botanist. She applied for but failed to obtain positions at both the University of Canterbury and Victoria University of Wellington. This was in spite of the fact that her botanic research and writing was extremely prolific and praised by eminent botanists such as Dr Leonard Cockayne. She was employed from 1929 to 1938 as a demonstrator in zoology at the University of Auckland. She was awarded the Duffus Lubecki Scholarship annually between 1929 and 1931. This scholarship enabled her to undertake scientific research and she was able to balance this work with her demonstrating commitments.

She undertook a series of trips to Mt Moehau at the tip of the Coromandel Peninsula as field work for the Duffus Lubecki Scholarship. She was accompanied on most of these field trips by her close friend and fellow botanist, Lucy Cranwell. The two botanists made a number of field trips into remote parts of the country in order to contribute to information about native flora. The Moehau expeditions were followed in 1930 by a field trip to Maungapohatu, deep in the heart of the Urewera country. Together they wrote important papers on the northern high-peak vegetation of Mt Moehau and Maungapohatu, and on the Hen and Chickens Islands.

In May 1935 the two botanists began a 10-month trip to Britain and Europe, where they attended botanical congresses in London and Amsterdam. Moore had the opportunity to work briefly at Kristineberg and Plymouth marine biological stations, and to demonstrate zoology at University College London. Upon their return to New Zealand they continued their field work together. Moore and Cranwell also produced zoological research, writing a highly original and influential joint paper on the intertidal zonation of the Poor Knights Islands that was published in 1938.

In 1938 Moore obtained a position in the botany division of the Department of Scientific and Industrial Research (DSIR). She was given responsibility for lower plants, and also assigned to work on weeds. This led to an important paper on the pasture invasion and life history of the hard fern Paesia, published in 1942. During the Second World War, she developed a project involving the extraction of agar from seaweed, in order to grow cultures for bacteria. Japan had previously been the world supplier of agar. In later years Moore was to remain an algologist, working with the botanical artist Nancy M. Adams to produce the widely read Plants of the New Zealand coast in 1963.

After the war Moore changed her research field to the tussock-lands of Molesworth, in Marlborough. She published on the invasive scabweed Raoulia in 1953, on Rumex-dominated communities in 1954, and in 1955 and 1956 on introduced grass and tussock establishment. At the International Botanical Congress at Stockholm in 1950 she spoke on both Raoulia ecology and Sphacelaria, a small brown alga.

In 1953 Moore began worked with Dr Harry Allan on Volume I of the Flora of New Zealand. Her contributions include taxonomic revision in Colobanthus, Myosotis, Ourisia, Plantago, Pomaderris, and Veronica (as Hebe). Allan's death in 1957 left her with editorial responsibility for the whole project. She produced Volume II of the series with Dr Elizabeth Edgar. In 1960 Moore moved to the botany division of the DSIR at Lincoln. The shift coincided with the start of work on the second volume of the series. This work prompted Moore to write separate papers on asteliads, Bulbinella, Libertia and orchids. Published in 1970, Volume II of Flora of New Zealand was hailed for its thorough scholarship.

=== Retirement ===
Although Moore retired in 1971 she remained active at Lincoln until 1980. The final grassland ecology bulletin, The changing vegetation of Molesworth station, New Zealand, 1944 to 1971, appeared in 1976, and in 1978 she produced The Oxford Book of New Zealand Plants with J. B. Irwin as botanical illustrator. She returned to Warkworth in 1980. In 1985 she gave a lecture to the Auckland Botanical Society looking back on the work she and Cranwell did in the 1920s. In 1986 she gave another lecture, the inaugural Lucy Cranwell Lecture to the Auckland Botanical Society.

=== Death ===
Moore died on 9 June 1987 at her Orewa rest home.

== Published works ==
Along with the above-mentioned books, Moore published numerous scientific papers on a range of subjects including marine and terrestrial ecology, the taxonomy of flowering plants, seaweeds and barnacles, plant geography, flower biology, carpology and the history of New Zealand botany.

== Honours and awards ==
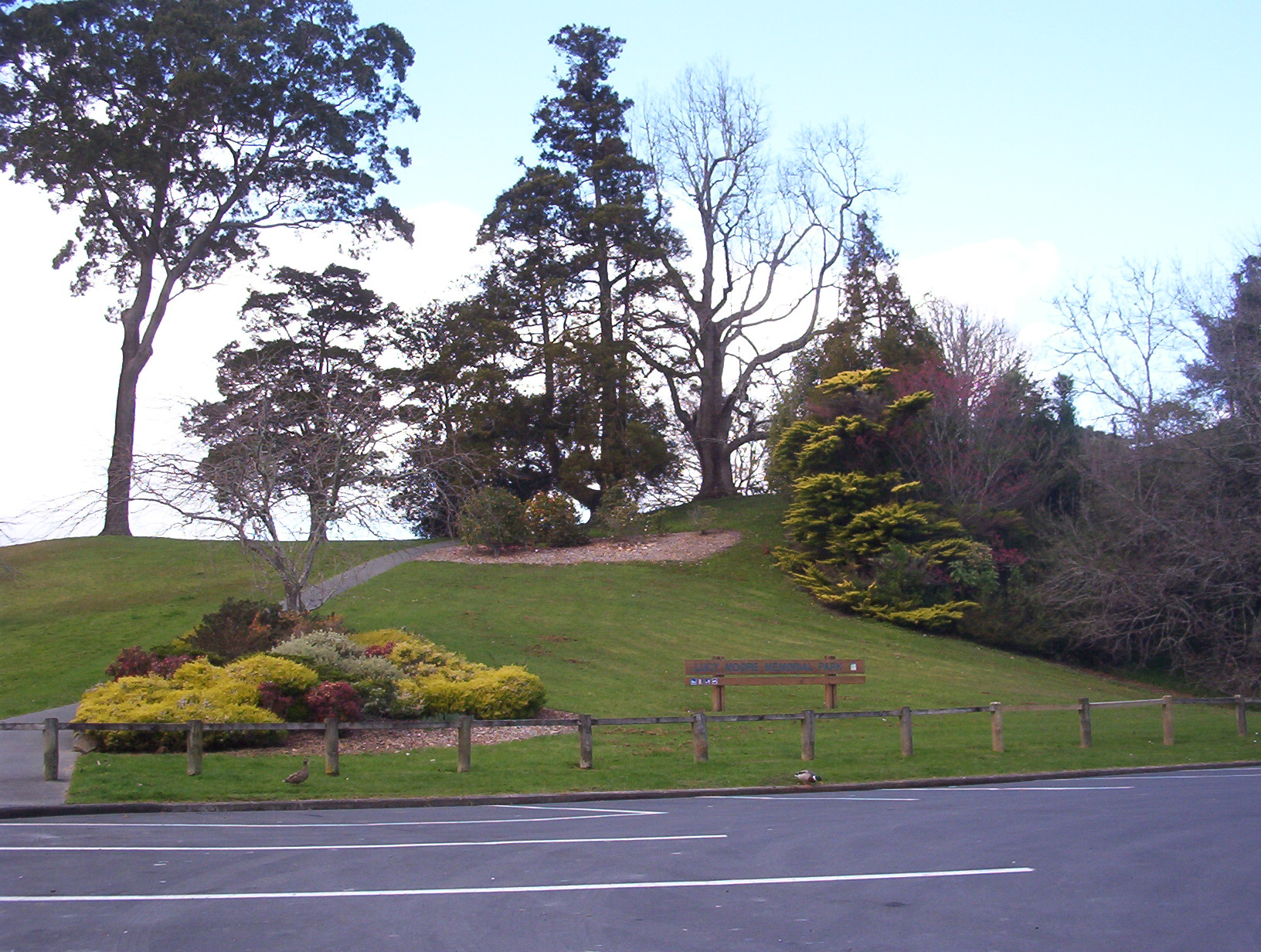
Lucy Moore Memorial Park

In 1945, Moore was elected a fellow of the Linnean Society of London. She was appointed a Member of the Order of the British Empire in the 1959 Queen's Birthday Honours, and in 1963 the University of Canterbury gave her its DSc for her Hebe research. A fellow of the Royal Society of New Zealand from 1947, she was awarded its Hutton Medal in 1965. In the same year she delivered the Leonard Cockayne Memorial Lecture. In 1974 she was awarded the Sir Ernest Marsden Medal for Service to Science by the New Zealand Association of Scientists.

Moore also established the Allan Mere Award in honour of Harry Allan which is now presented by the New Zealand Botanical Society to outstanding botanists in acknowledgement of their significant contribution to botany in New Zealand. The Mere that Moore donated for the prize is housed at the Allan Herbarium at Landcare Research, Lincoln.

Lucy Moore Memorial Park in Warkworth is named after her.

The New Zealand native grass species Festuca luciarum is named after Moore and her fellow botanist Lucy Cranwell.

In 2017, Moore was selected as one of the Royal Society Te Apārangi's "150 women in 150 words", celebrating the contributions of women to knowledge in New Zealand.
