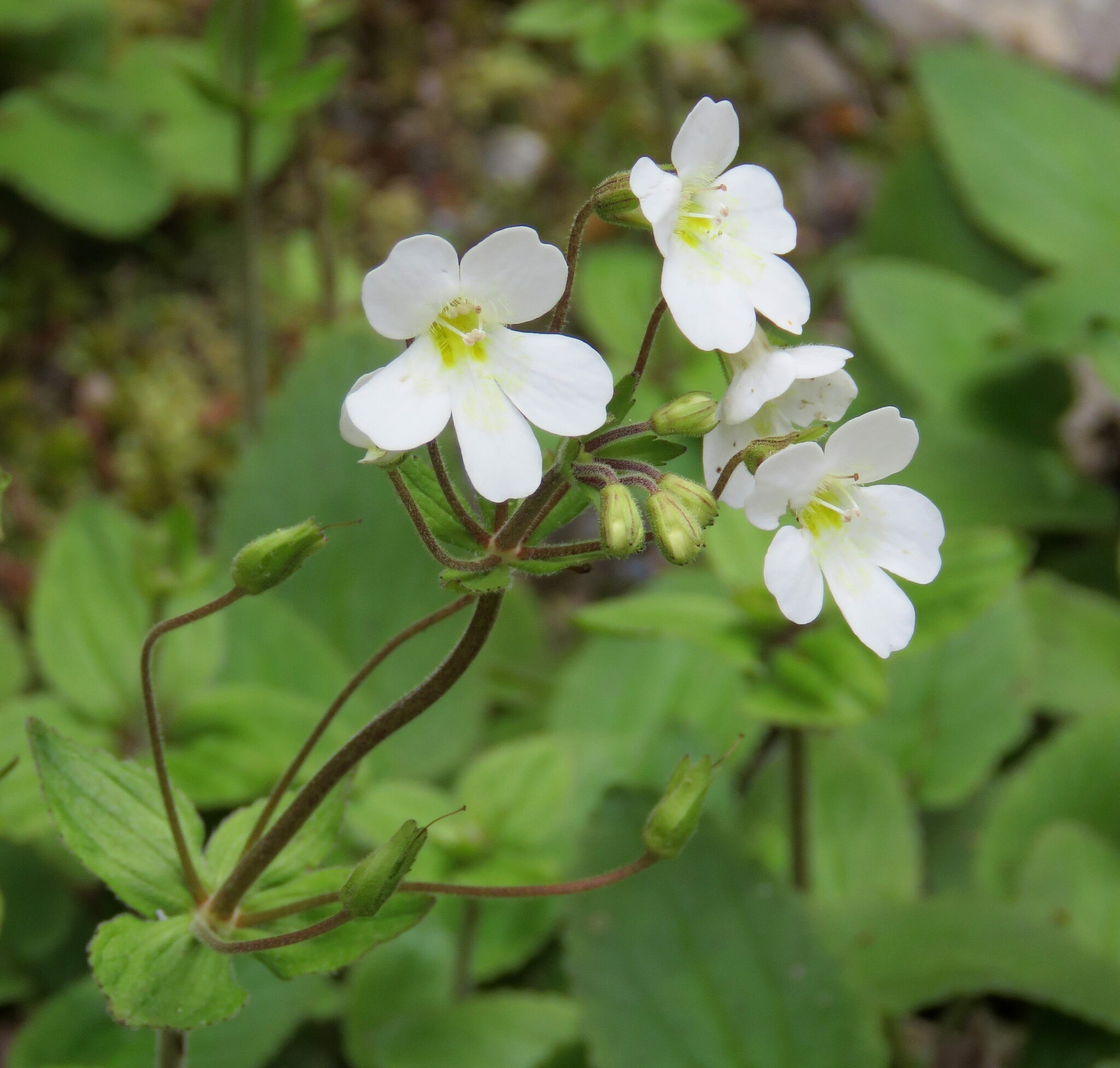
- Flowering plant of Ourisia macrophylla subsp. lactea plant observed in Arthur's Pass National Park, New Zealand

Conservation status
- Not Threatened (NZ TCS)

Scientific classification
- Kingdom: Plantae
- Clade: Tracheophytes
- Clade: Angiosperms
- Clade: Eudicots
- Clade: Asterids
- Order: Lamiales
- Family: Plantaginaceae
- Genus: Ourisia
- Species: O. macrophylla
- Subspecies: O. m. subsp. lactea

Trinomial name
- Ourisia macrophylla subsp. lactea (L.B.Moore) Meudt

Synonyms
- Ourisia macrophylla var. lactea L.B.Moore; Ourisia lactea (L.B.Moore) Arroyo

= Ourisia macrophylla subsp. lactea =

Subspecies of flowering plant

Ourisia macrophylla subsp. lactea is a subspecies of flowering plant in the family Plantaginaceae that is endemic to the South Island of New Zealand. Lucy Moore described O. macrophylla var. lactea in 1961, and Heidi Meudt changed the rank to subspecies in 2006. Plants of this subspecies of New Zealand foxglove are showy, perennial, large-leaved, tufted, rhizomatous herbs that are often hairy with non-glandular or glandular hairs. They have crenate, ovate to heart-shaped leaves. The flowers are in whorls in each node, with a regular calyx, and a large, white irregular corolla. The calyx and floral bracts have glandular hairs. The corolla tube is yellow with three lines of yellow hairs inside. It is found in montane to subalpine habitats and is listed as Not Threatened.

== Taxonomy ==
Ourisia macrophylla subsp. lactea is in the plant family Plantaginaceae. Lucy Moore described O. macrophylla var. lactea in 1961.

The type material was collected by Leonard Cockayne in 1898 at Arthur's Pass, South Island, New Zealand. The holotype is housed at herbarium WELT at the Museum of New Zealand Te Papa Tongarewa.

In the Flora of New Zealand, Lucy Moore recognised five varieties within O. macrophylla as well as O. colensoi, whereas Mary Kalin Arroyo recognised two subspecies of O. macrophylla and two subspecies of O. lactea.

In the most recent taxonomic treatment, many of these names were synonymised, and only two allopatric subspecies of O. macrophylla are recognised: North Island Ourisia macrophylla subsp. macrophylla and South Island O. macrophylla subsp. lactea. The subspecies can be distinguished from one another by the hairs on the calyx and floral bracts, which lack glandular hairs in subsp. macrophylla but have glandular hairs in subsp. lactea.

== Description ==
Ourisia macrophylla subsp. lactea plants are large perennial herbs. The stems are creeping, with opposite leaves that are tightly tufted along the horizontal stem. Leaf petioles are 4.3–225.0 mm long. Leaf blades are 13.0–103.2 mm long by 9.7–68.9 mm wide (length: width ratio 0.9–1.5: 1), usually narrowly ovate to ovate, usually widest below the middle, with a rounded apex; truncate or cuneate base; and crenate edges. Leaves are glabrous or with few hairs to densely hairy with non-glandular hairs on both surfaces, and punctate on the lower surface. Inflorescences are erect, with hairy racemes up to 64.8 cm long, and with 1–6 flowering nodes and up to 53 total flowers per raceme. Each flowering node has up to 12 flowers and 2–12 sessile and sometimes clasping bracts that are usually narrowly lanceolate to narrowly ovate. The lowest bracts are similar to the leaves, 10.4–78.9 mm long and 4.0–32.0 mm wide, and become smaller toward the apex of the raceme. The uppermost floral bracts are usually densely hairy with both glandular and non-glandular hairs. The flowers are borne on a densely hairy pedicel that is up to 56.4 mm long and usually has both glandular and non-glandular hairs. The calyx is 3.6–10.0 mm long, regular, with all five lobes divided to the base, and with isolated to sparsely distributed hairs, which are glandular. The corolla is 10.3–22.2 mm long (including the 2.9–12.3 mm long corolla tube), bilabiate, tubular-funnelform, usually hairy, and white on the outside (sometimes flushed pink), and yellow and with three lines and a ring of yellow hairs on the inside. The corolla lobes are 3.1–11.1 mm long, spreading, and obcordate or obovate-spathulate. There are 4 stamens up to 11.2 mm long which are didynamous, with two long stamens that are exserted or reaching the corolla tube, and 2 short stamens also usually reaching the corolla tube opening; a short staminode 0.3–1.0 mm long is also usually present. The style is 3.7–8.2 mm long, exserted, with an emarginate stigma. The ovary is 1.6–4.4 mm long and glabrous. Fruits are capsules 4.3–8.6 mm long and 3.7–6.0 mm wide with loculicidal dehiscence and pedicels up to 74.6 mm long. It is unknown how many seeds are in each capsule, and seeds are 0.5–1.1 mm long and 0.2–0.4 mm wide, with a two-layered, reticulate seed coat.

Ourisia macrophylla subsp. lactea flowers from December to April and fruits from December to May.

The chromosome number of Ourisia macrophylla subsp. lactea is 2n=48.

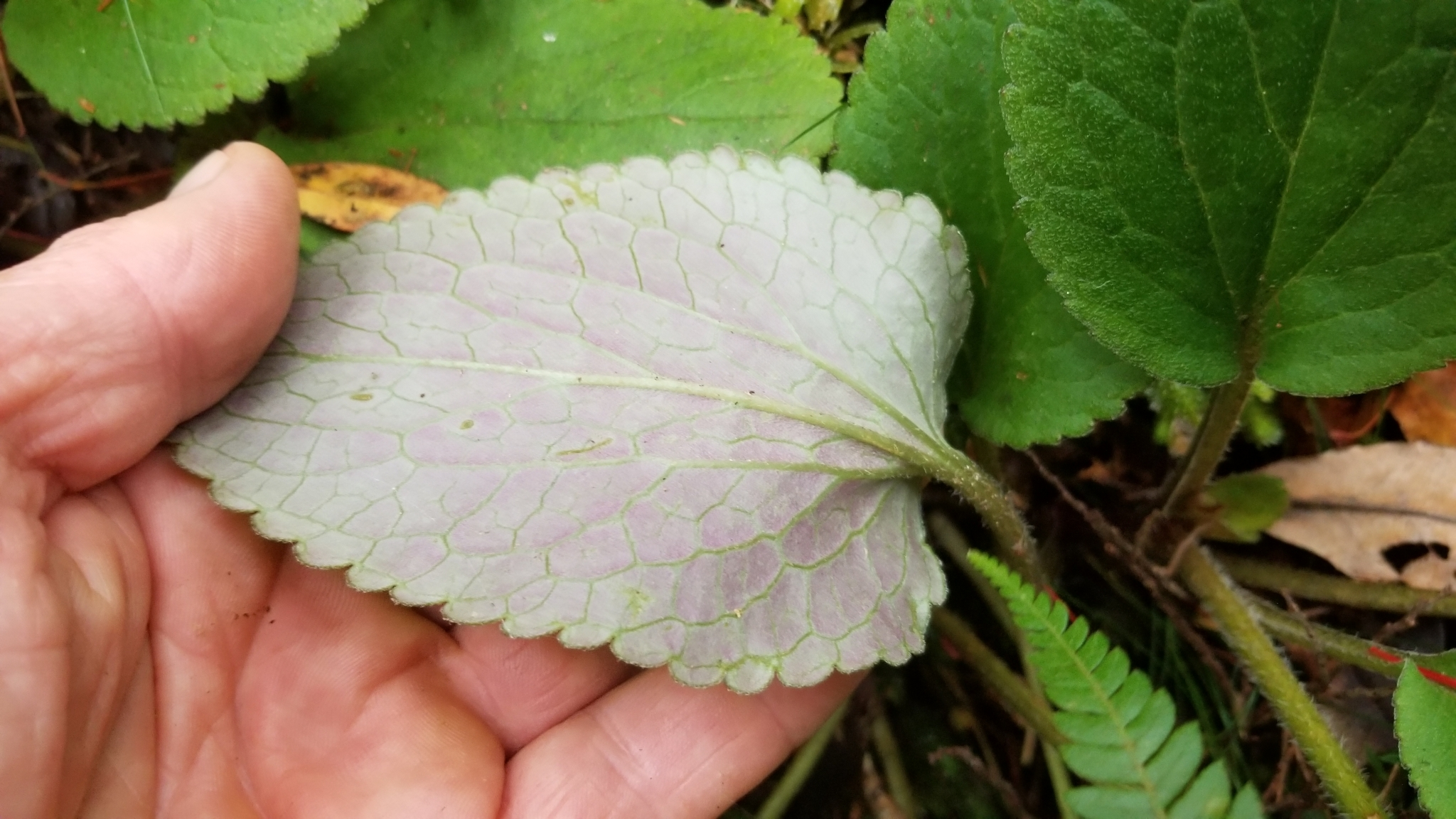
Underside of a leaf

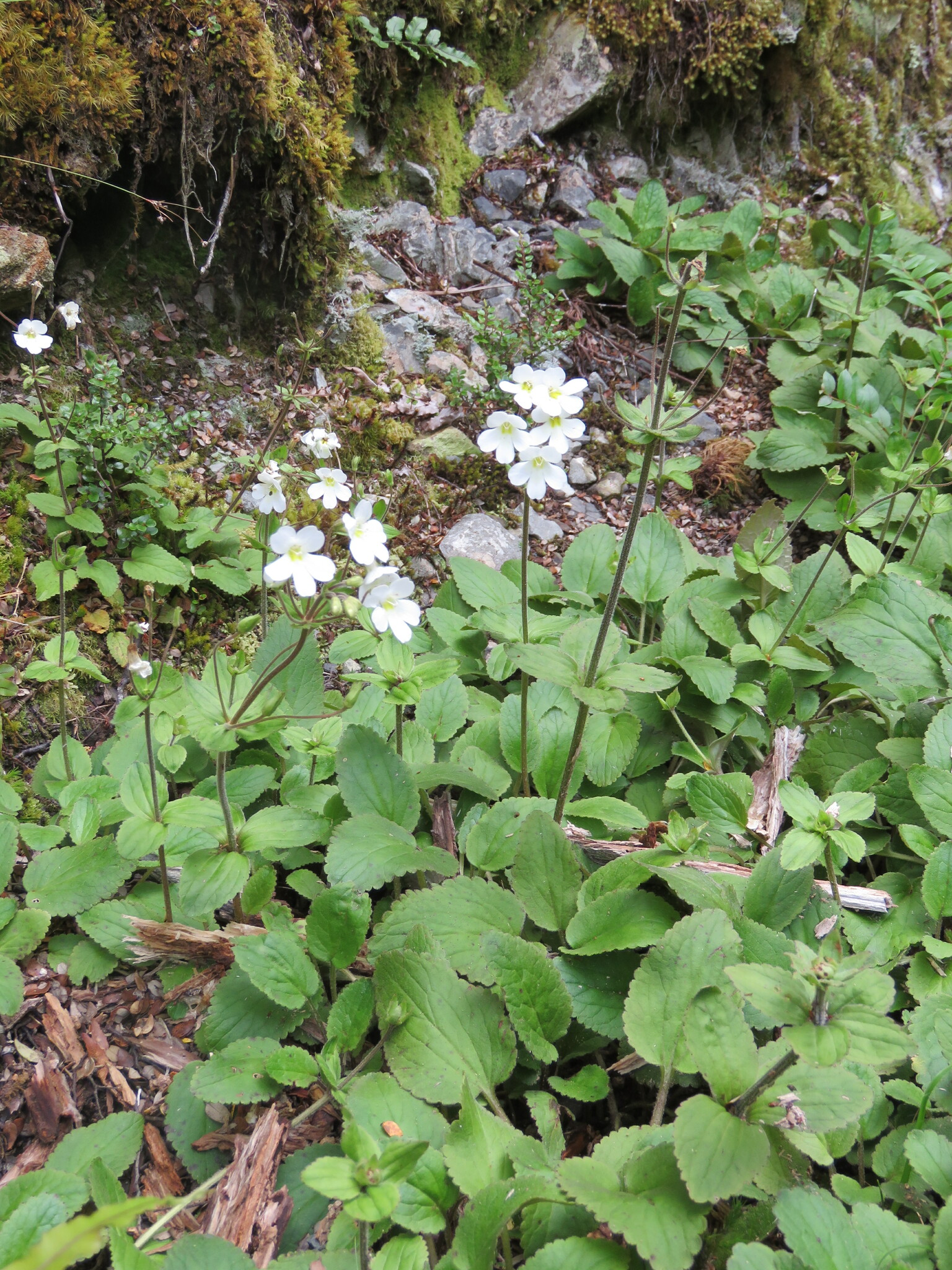
Flowering plants

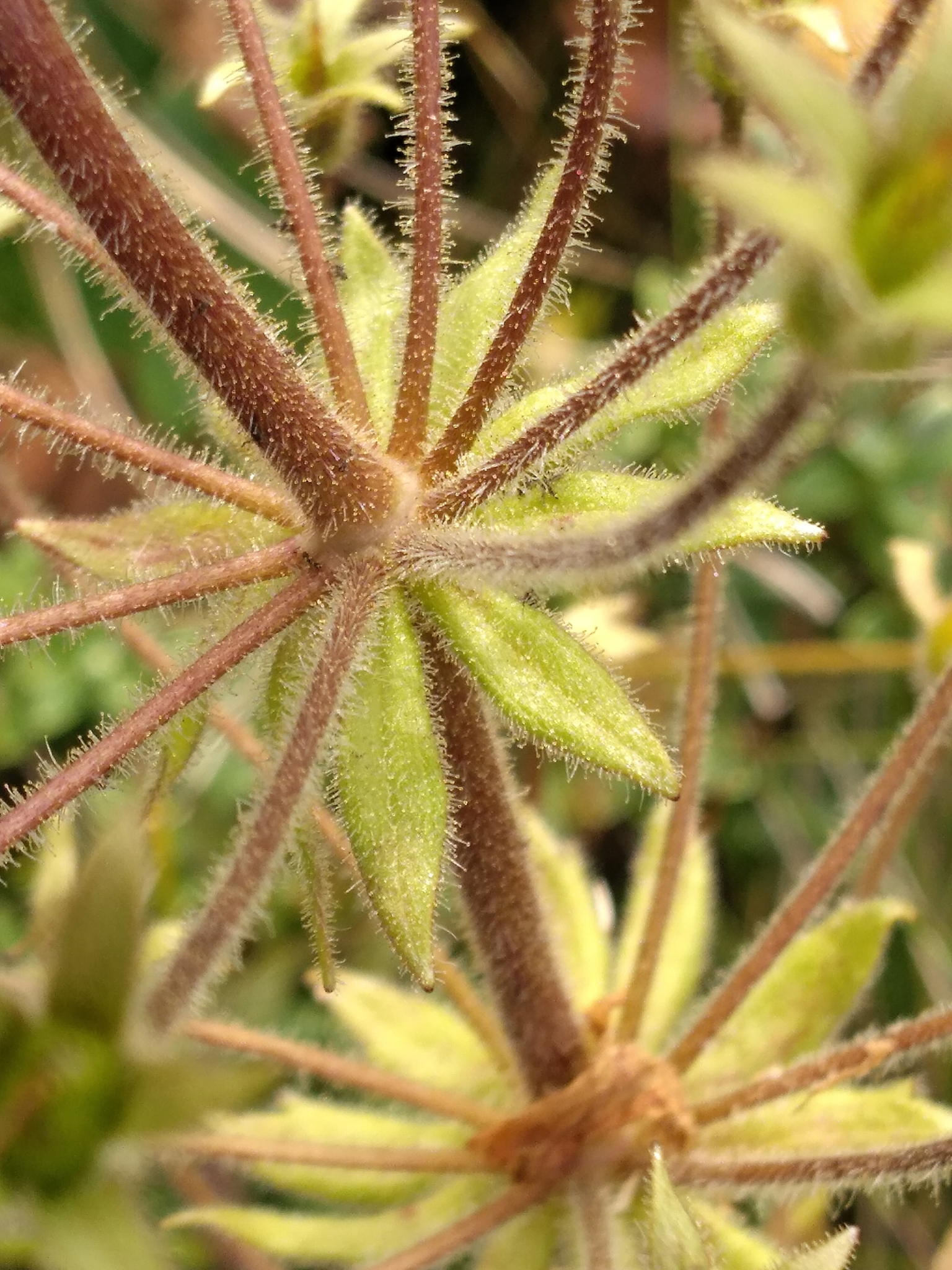
Peduncle and pedicels with glandular hairs

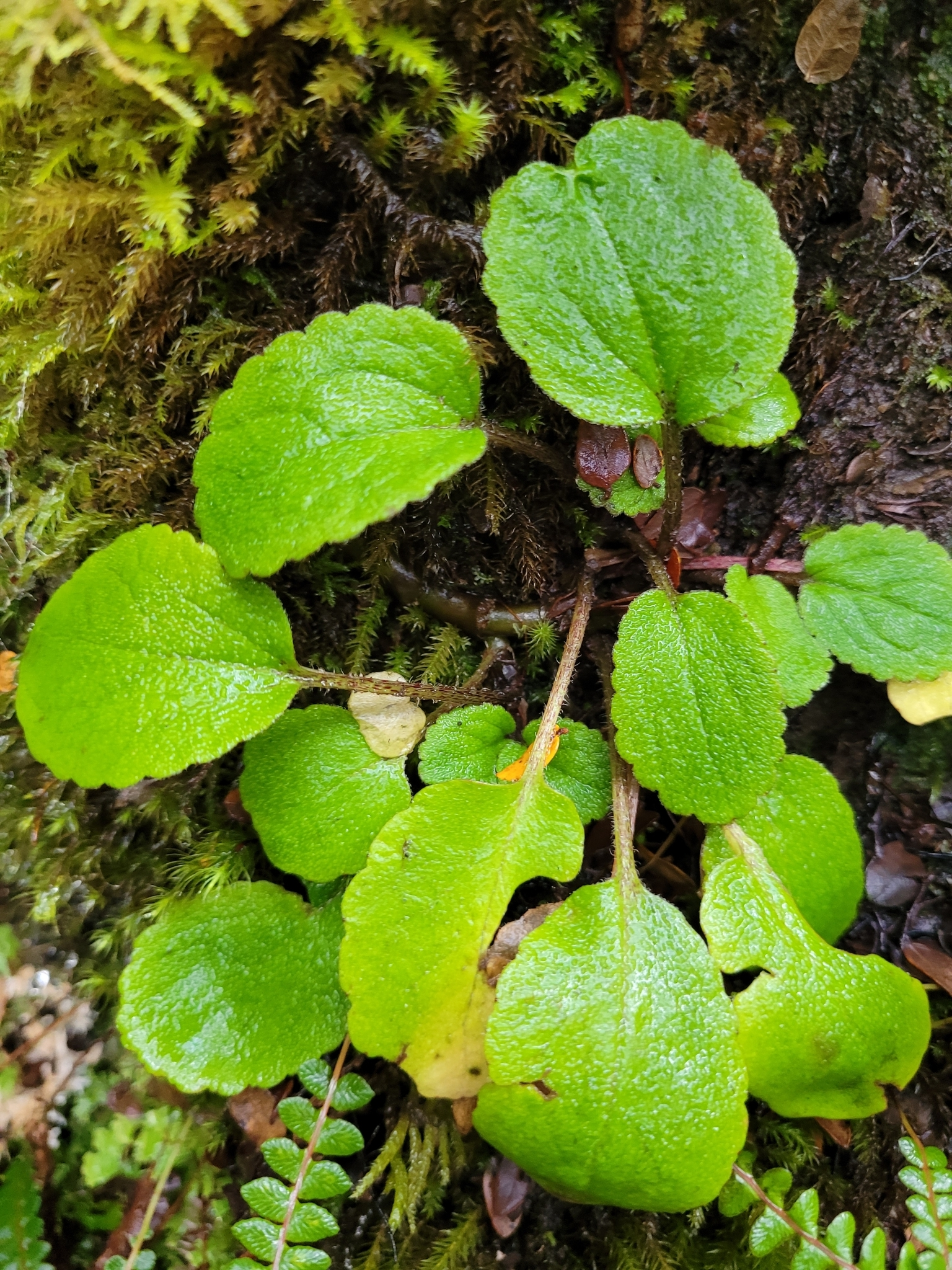
Leaves

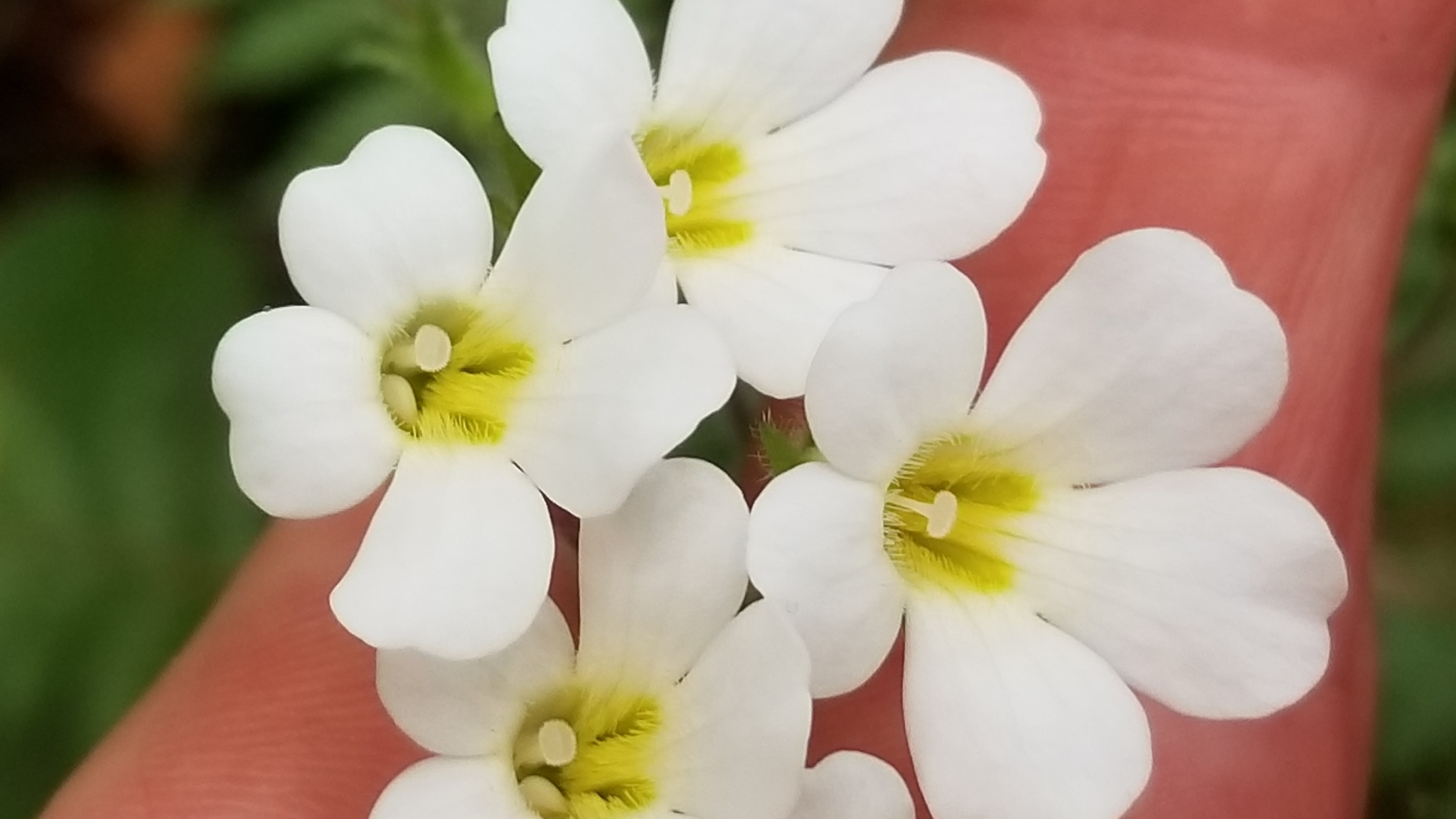
Close-up of flowers

== Distribution and habitat ==
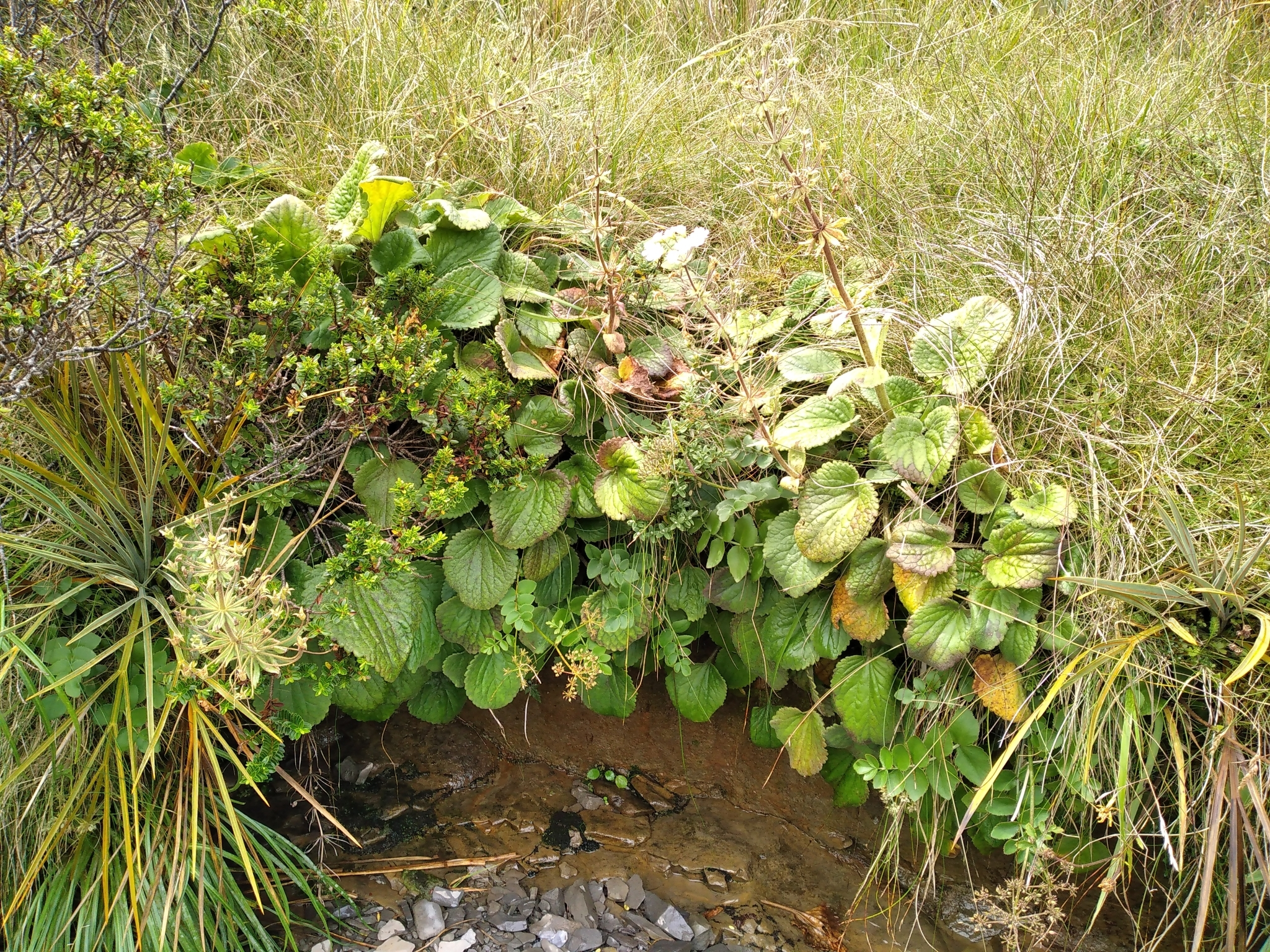
Ourisia macrophylla subsp. lactea in its native habitat

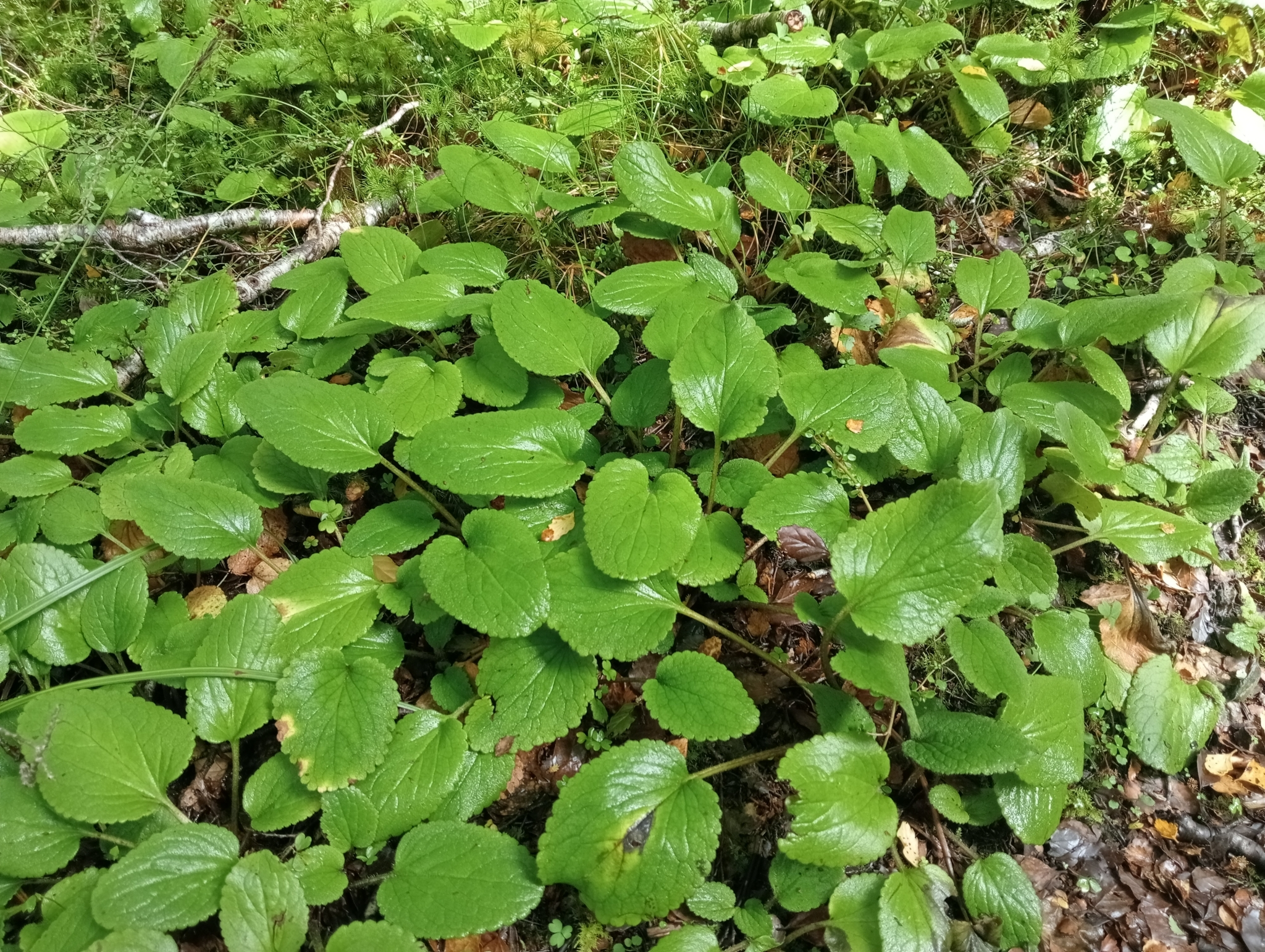
Leaves of O. macrophylla subsp. lactea

Ourisia macrophylla subsp. lactea is probably endemic to the South Island (in Western Nelson, Marlborough, Canterbury, and Westland), however a specimen from Patea could be rare North Island populations of this subspecies. This subspecies is usually found below the bushline, in damp to wet, shaded streams, waterfalls, cliffs, sides of tracks, in Nothofagus forest, or just above bushline in subalpine or alpine habitats including tussock grassland or scrubland, from 70 to 1,700 m (230 to 5,580 ft) above sea level. It may be very locally common.

== Phylogeny ==
Two individuals of O. macrophylla subsp. lactea were included in phylogenetic analyses of all species of the genus Ourisia using standard DNA sequencing markers (two nuclear ribosomal DNA markers and two chloroplast DNA regions) and morphological data. In all analyses, the two sampled individuals belonged to the highly supported New Zealand lineage, and in the nuclear ribosomal and combined datasets, they were all very closely related to one another and to other large-leaved species of New Zealand Ourisia, O. macrophylla subsp. macrophylla, O. vulcanica, O. crosbyi and O. calycina.

In another phylogenetic study using amplified fragment length polymorphisms (AFLPs), 20 individuals were sampled of O. macrophylla subsp. lactea. This subspecies was sister to the other subspecies, and the species O. macrophylla was also monophyletic, with moderate to high support in the phylogenetic analyses of AFLP data. O. macrophylla was part of a highly supported clade that was in a larger clade of other large-leaved species, i.e. O. macrocarpa, O. crosbyi, O. calycina and O. vulcanica. The 36 sampled individuals of O. macrophylla however did not comprise one of the significant clusters in the Bayesian clustering analysis, nor did either of the subspecies.

== Conservation status ==
Ourisia macrophylla subsp. lactea is listed as Not Threatened in the most recent assessment (2017–2018) of the New Zealand Threatened Classification for plants.
