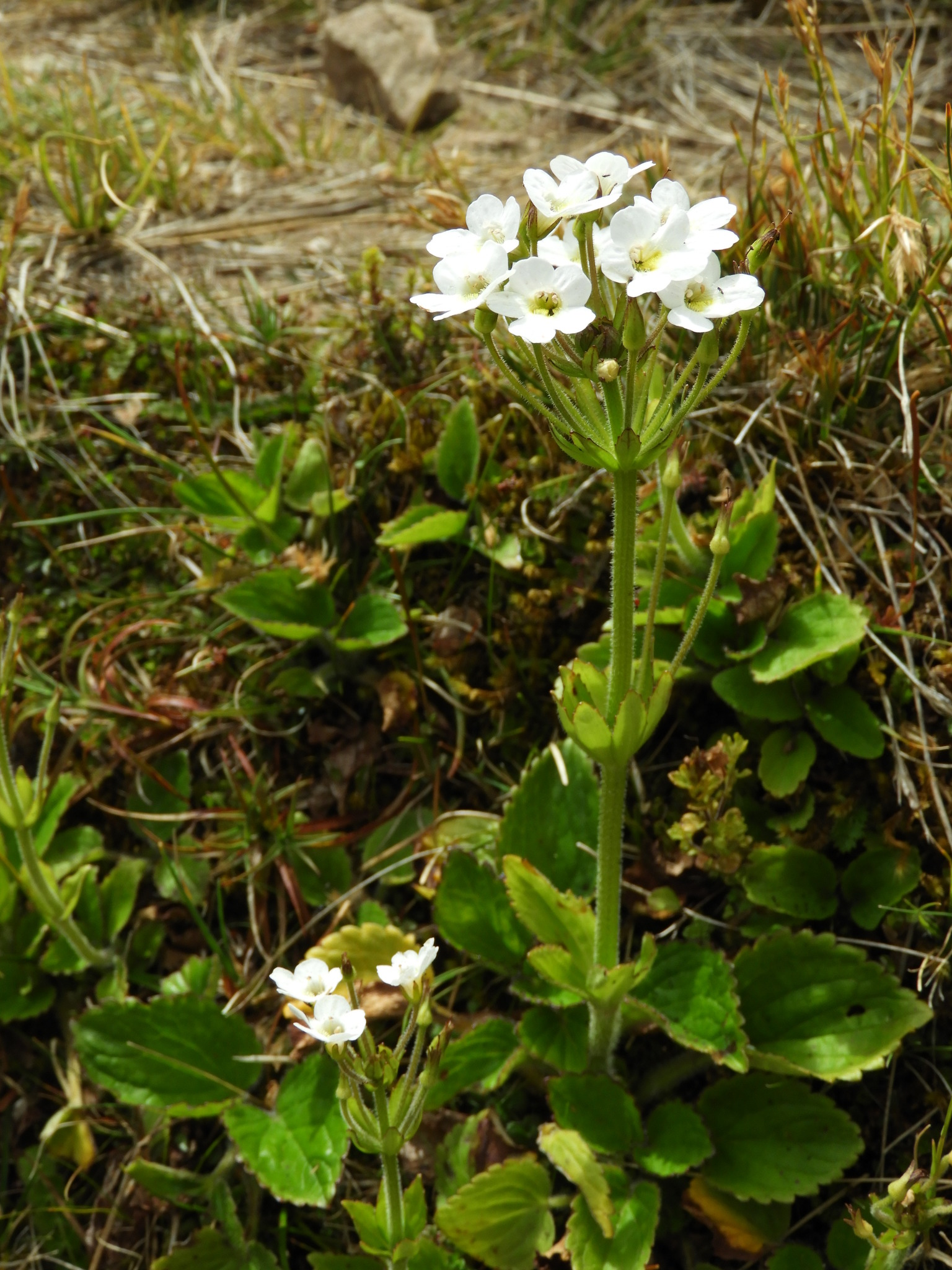
- Flowering O. macrophylla plant observed in the Raukūmara Range, New Zealand

Conservation status
- Not Threatened (NZ TCS)

Scientific classification
- Kingdom: Plantae
- Clade: Tracheophytes
- Clade: Angiosperms
- Clade: Eudicots
- Clade: Asterids
- Order: Lamiales
- Family: Plantaginaceae
- Genus: Ourisia
- Species: O. macrophylla
- Subspecies: O. m. subsp. macrophylla

Trinomial name
- Ourisia macrophylla subsp. macrophylla Hook.

Synonyms
- Ourisia colensoi Hook.f.; Ourisia robusta (Colenso) Simpson & Thomson; Ourisia macrophylla var. robusta (Colenso) Arroyo; Ourisia macrophylla var. drucei L.B.Moore; Ourisia lactea subsp. drucei (L.B.Moore) Arroyo; Ourisia macrophylla var. meadii L.B.Moore

= Ourisia macrophylla subsp. macrophylla =

Subspecies of flowering plant

Ourisia macrophylla subsp. macrophylla is a subspecies of flowering plant in the family Plantaginaceae that is endemic to the North Island of New Zealand. William Jackson Hooker described O. macrophylla in 1843. Plants of this subspecies of New Zealand foxglove are showy, perennial, large-leaved, tufted, rhizomatous herbs that are often glabrous (hairless) or sometimes hairy with non-glandular or glandular hairs. They have crenate, ovate to heart-shaped leaves. The flowers are in whorls in each node, with a regular calyx, and a large, white irregular corolla. The calyx and floral bracts lack glandular hairs. The corolla tube is yellow with three lines of yellow hairs inside. It is found in montane to subalpine habitats and is listed as Not Threatened.

== Taxonomy ==
Ourisia macrophylla Hook. subsp. macrophylla is in the plant family Plantaginaceae. William Jackson Hooker described O. macrophylla in 1843.

The type material was collected by German botanist Ernst Dieffenbach on "Mt Egmont" (Mt Taranaki). The holotype is housed at the herbarium of the Royal Botanical Gardens Kew.

In the Flora of New Zealand, Lucy Moore recognised five varieties within O. macrophylla as well as O. colensoi, whereas Mary Kalin Arroyo recognised two subspecies of O. macrophylla and two subspecies of O. lactea.

In the most recent taxonomic treatment, many of these names were synonymised, and only two allopatric subspecies of O. macrophylla are recognised: North Island Ourisia macrophylla subsp. macrophylla and South Island O. macrophylla subsp. lactea. The subspecies can be distinguished from one another by the hairs on the calyx and floral bracts, which lack glandular hairs in subsp. macrophylla but have glandular hairs in subsp. lactea.

== Description ==
Ourisia macrophylla subsp. macrophylla plants are large perennial herbs. The stems are creeping, with opposite leaves that are tightly tufted along the horizontal stem. Leaf petioles are 4.3–225.0 mm long. Leaf blades are 10.4–160.0 mm long by 5.9–99.0 mm wide (length: width ratio 1.1–2.3: 1), narrowly ovate to broadly ovate, widest below the middle, with an acute apex; truncate, rounded, cuneate or cordate base; and crenate to crenate-serrate edges. Leaves are glabrous or with few hairs to densely hairy with non-glandular hairs on the upper surface, and on the lower surface with few hairs to densely hairy and punctate. Inflorescences are erect, with hairy racemes up to 64.8 cm long, and with 1–6 flowering nodes and up to 53 total flowers per raceme. Each flowering node has up to 12 flowers and 2–12 sessile and sometimes clasping bracts that are usually narrowly lanceolate to narrowly ovate. The lowest bracts are similar to the leaves, 10.4–78.9 mm long and 4.0–32.0 mm wide, and become smaller toward the apex of the raceme. The floral bracts are hairy with a few to sparsely distributed non-glandular hairs only, often on the margins and veins on the lower surface; there are no glandular hairs on the floral bracts. The flowers are borne on a densely hairy pedicel that is up to 56.4 mm long and usually has both glandular and non-glandular hairs. The calyx is 3.6–10.0 mm long, regular, with all five lobes divided to the base, and with isolated to sparsely distributed hairs, which are usually only non-glandular. The corolla is 10.3–22.2 mm long (including the 2.9–12.3 mm long corolla tube), bilabiate, tubular-funnelform, usually hairy, and white on the outside (sometimes flushed pink), and yellow and with three lines and a ring of yellow hairs on the inside. The corolla lobes are 3.1–11.1 mm long, spreading, and obcordate or obovate-spathulate. There are 4 stamens up to 11.2 mm long which are didynamous, with two long stamens that are exserted or reaching the corolla tube, and 2 short stamens also usually reaching the corolla tube opening; a short staminode 0.3–1.0 mm long is also usually present. The style is 3.7–8.2 mm long, exserted, with an emarginate stigma. The ovary is 1.6–4.4 mm long and glabrous. Fruits are capsules 4.3–8.6 mm long and 3.7–6.0 mm wide with loculicidal dehiscence and pedicels up to 74.6 mm long. It is unknown how many seeds are in each capsule, and seeds are 0.5–1.1 mm long and 0.2–0.4 mm wide, with a two-layered, reticulate seed coat.

Ourisia macrophylla subsp. macrophylla flowers from August to February and fruits from October to May.

The chromosome number of Ourisia macrophylla subsp. macrophylla is 2n = 48.

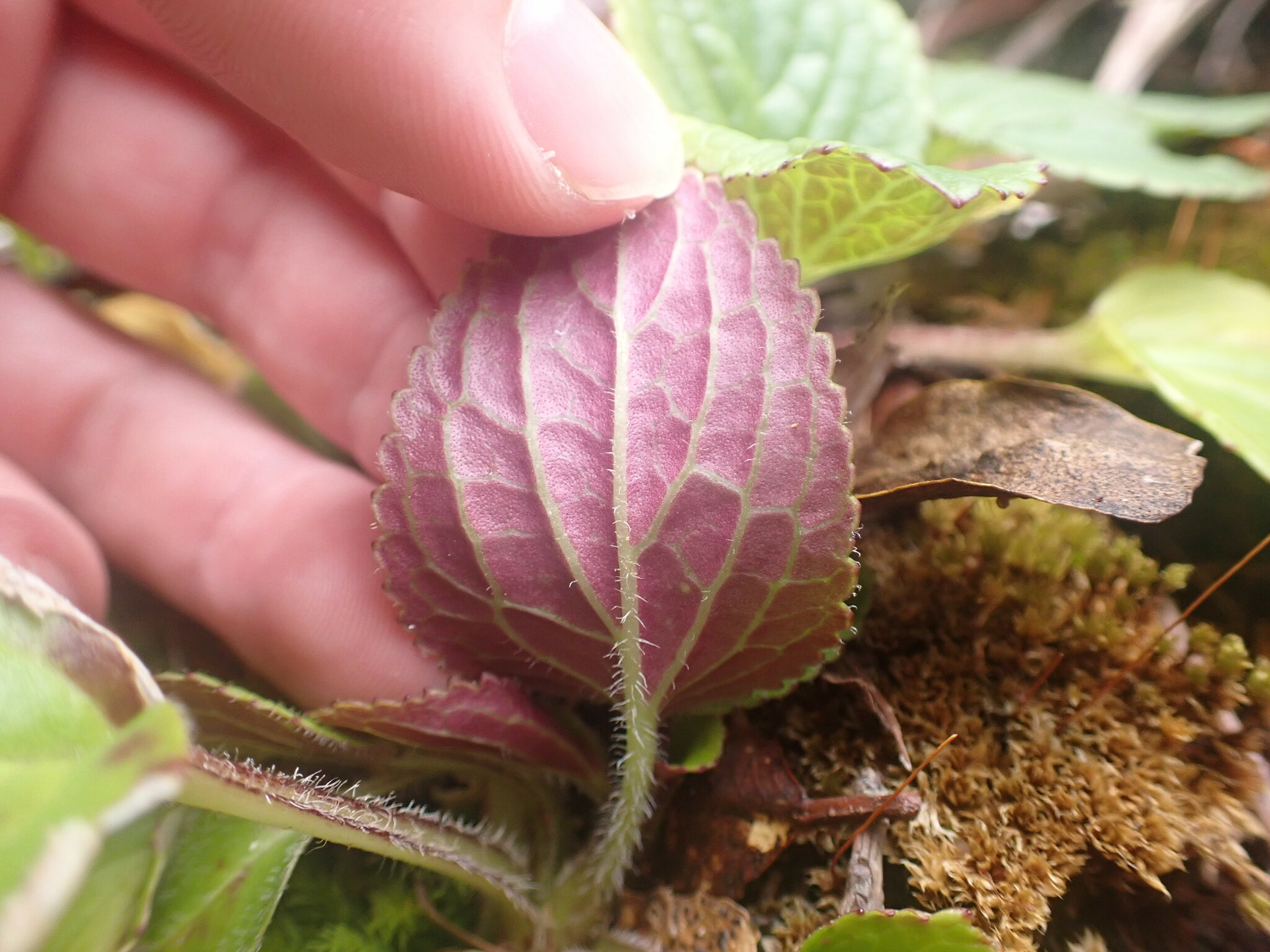
Underside of leaf

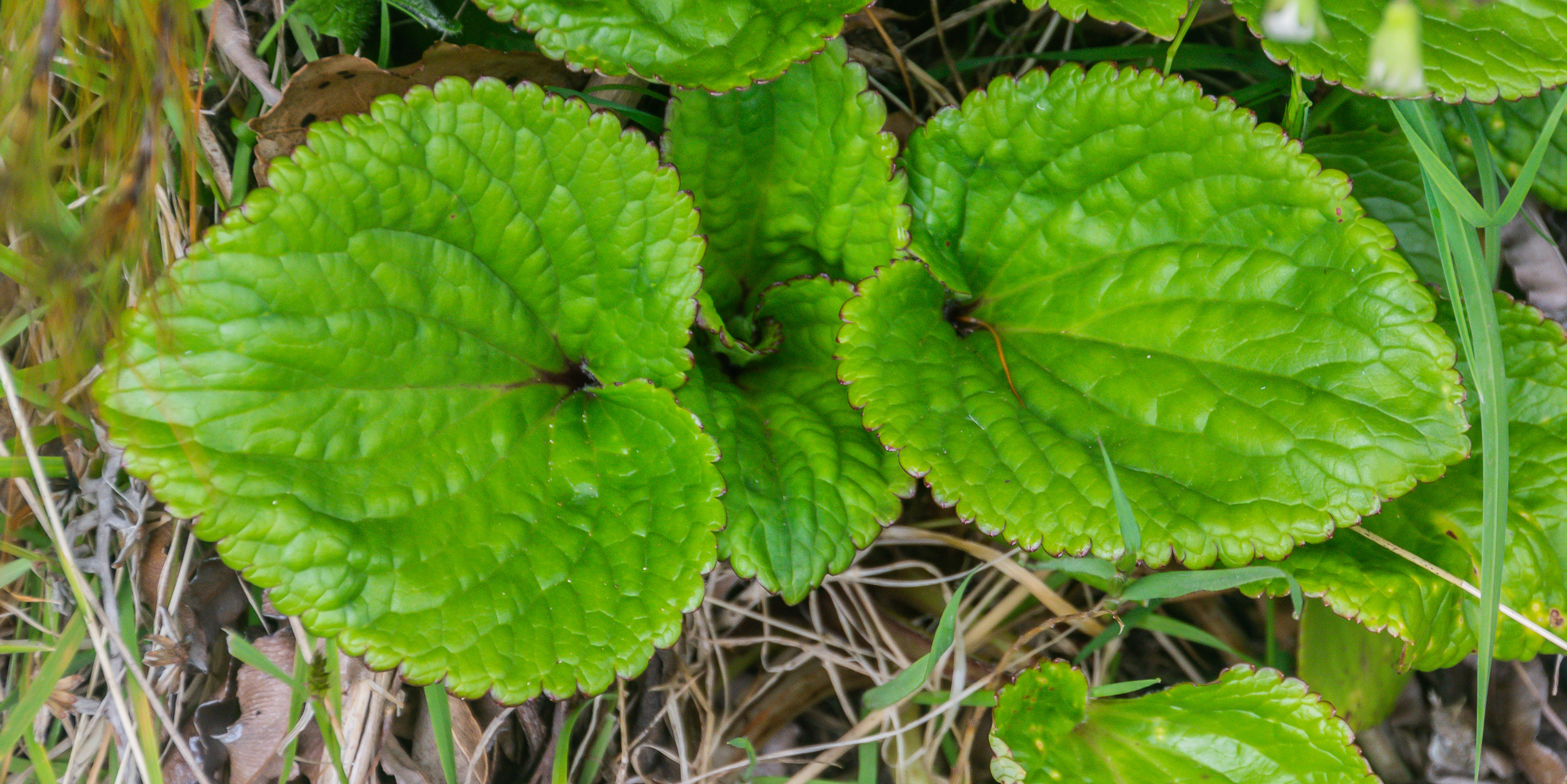
Heart-shaped leaves

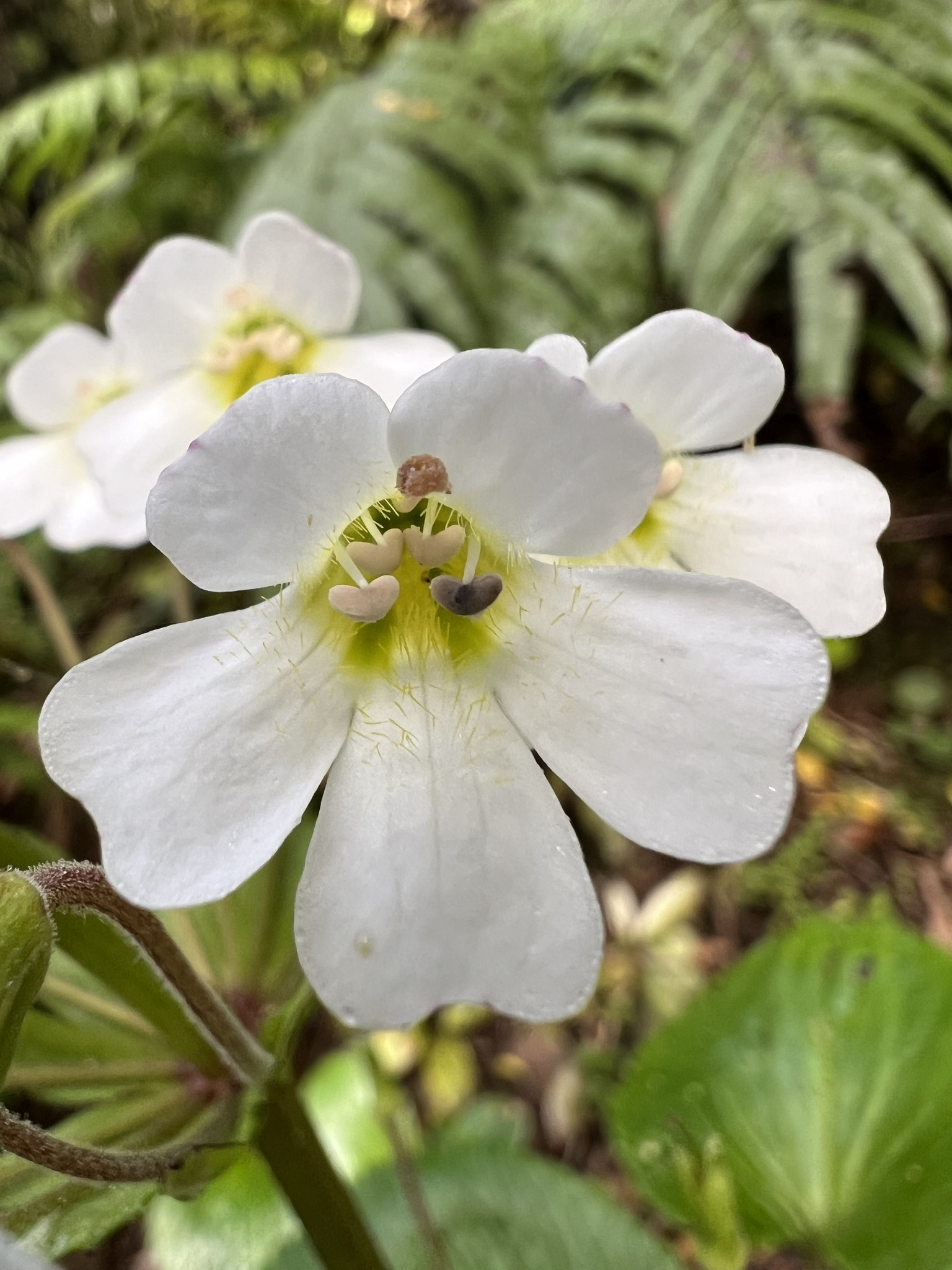
Close-up of flower

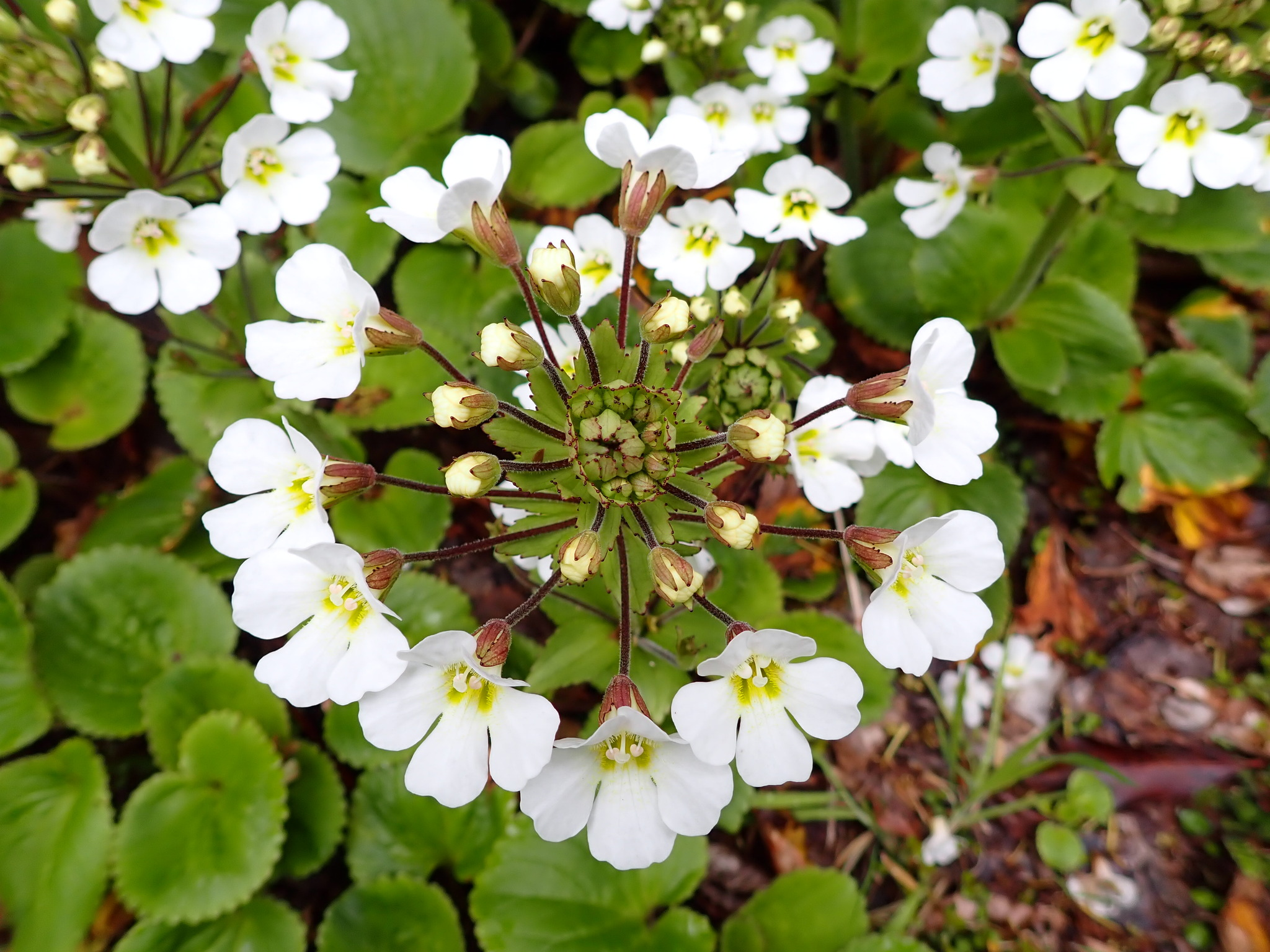
Whorls of flowers

== Distribution and habitat ==
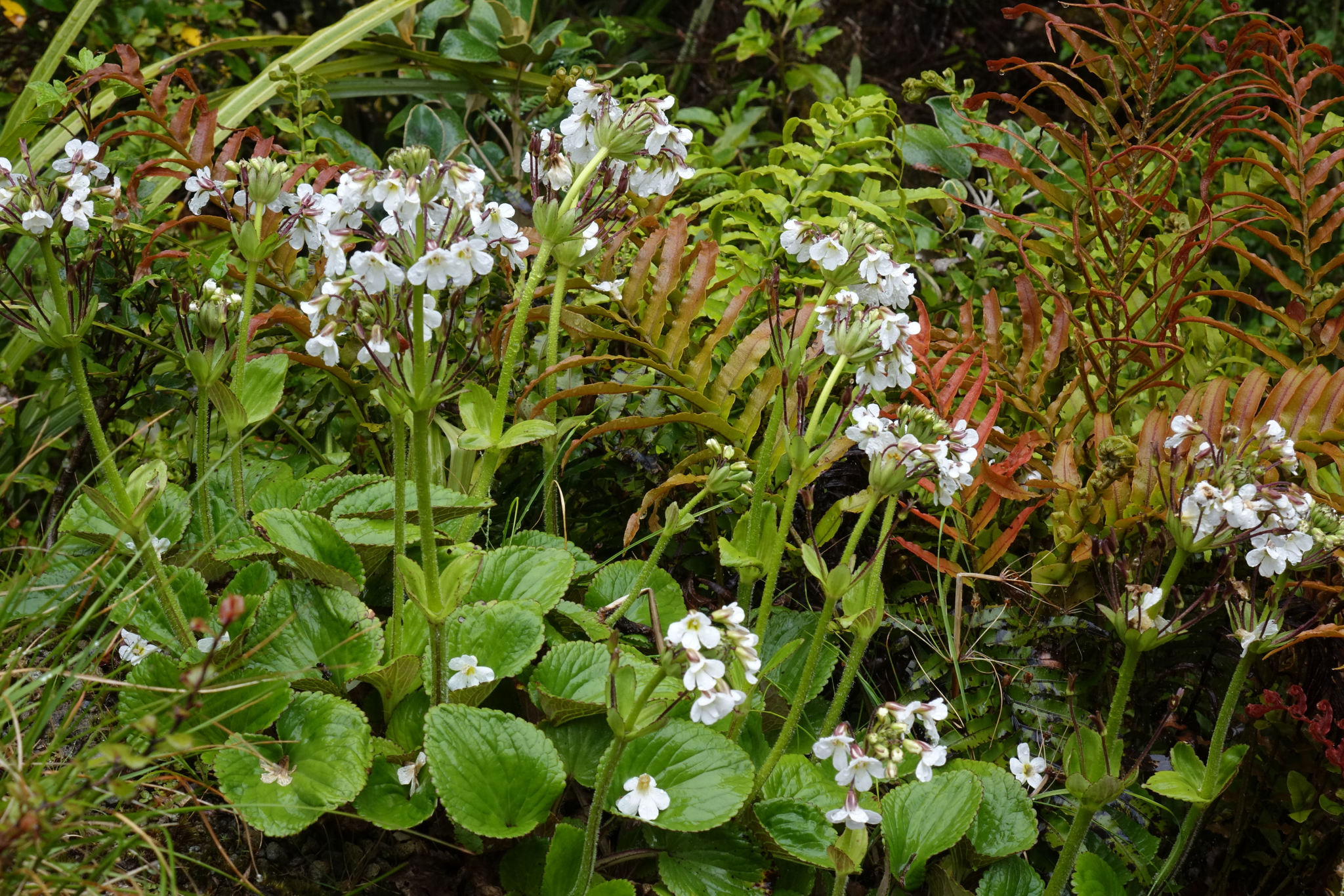
Ourisia macrophylla in its native habitat

Ourisia macrophylla subsp. macrophylla is probably endemic to the North Island (in Gisborne, Volcanic Plateau, Waikato, Taranaki, and southern North Island), however a few specimens from Paparoa National Park on could be rare South Island populations of this subspecies. This subspecies is usually found below the bushline, in damp to wet, shaded or sheltered areas in Nothofagus forest, herbfields, or grasslands, near cliffs, tracks, streams or waterfalls, or sometimes just above bushline in subalpine or alpine habitats, from 210 to 1,800 m (690 to 5,900 ft) above sea level. It can be very locally common.

== Phylogeny ==
Five individuals of O. macrophylla subsp. macrophylla were included in phylogenetic analyses of all species of the genus Ourisia using standard DNA sequencing markers (two nuclear ribosomal DNA markers and two chloroplast DNA regions) and morphological data. In all analyses, the five sampled individuals belonged to the highly supported New Zealand lineage, and in the nuclear ribosomal and combined datasets, they were all very closely related to one another together and to other large-leaved species of New Zealand Ourisia, O. macrophylla subsp. lactea, O. vulcanica, O. crosbyi and O. calycina.

In another phylogenetic study using amplified fragment length polymorphisms (AFLPs), 16 individuals were sampled of O. macrophylla subsp. macrophylla. This subspecies was sister to the other subspecies, and the species O. macrophylla was also monophyletic, with moderate to high support in the phylogenetic analyses of AFLP data. O. macrophylla was part of a highly supported clade that was in a larger clade of other large-leaved species, i.e. O. macrocarpa, O. crosbyi, O. calycina and O. vulcanica. The 36 sampled individuals of O. macrophylla however did not comprise one of the significant clusters in the Bayesian clustering analysis, nor did either of the subspecies.

== Conservation status ==
Ourisia macrophylla subsp. macrophylla is listed as Not Threatened in the most recent assessment (2017–2018) of the New Zealand Threatened Classification for plants.
