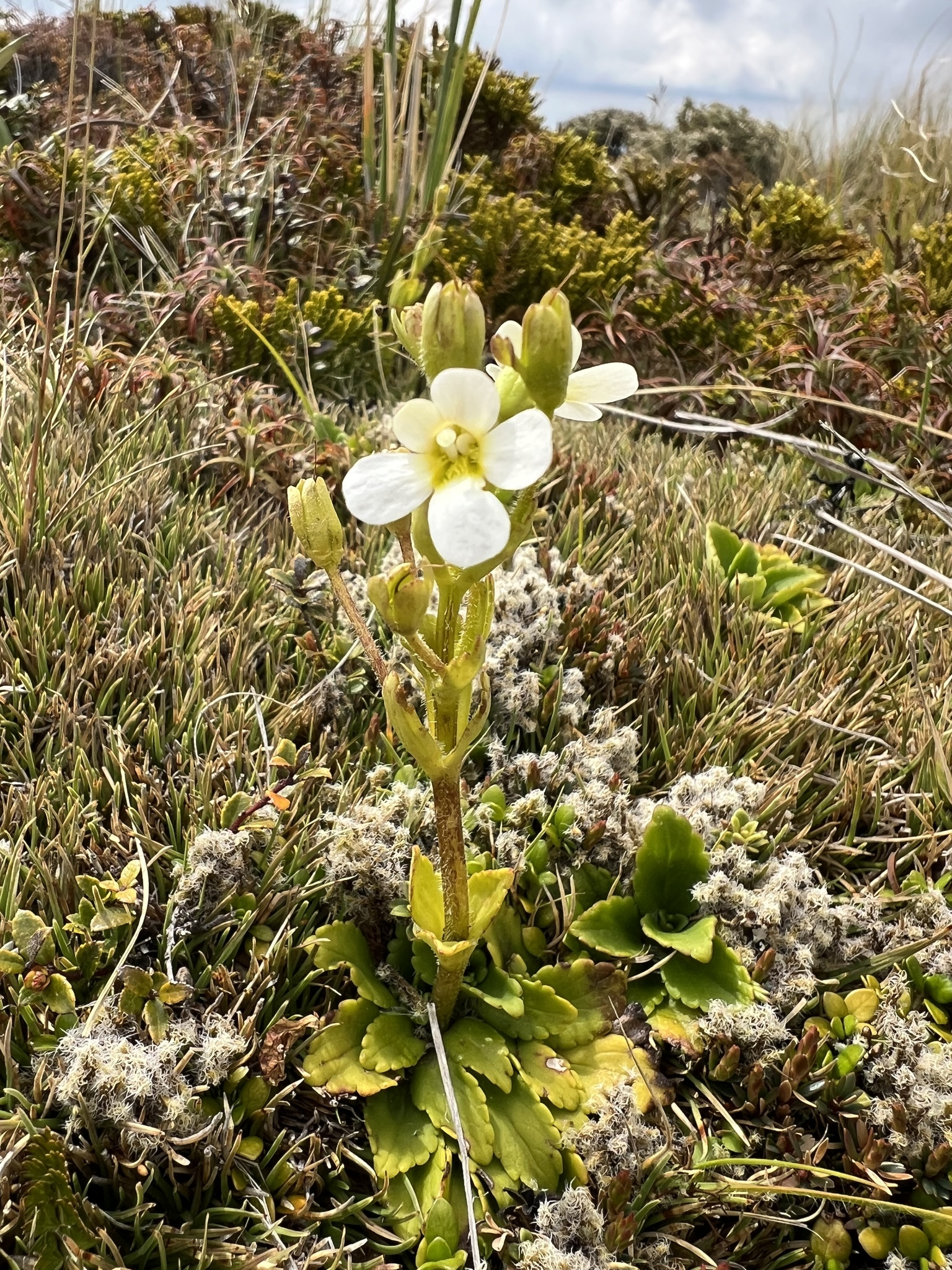
- Flowering plant of Ourisia vulcanica plant observed on the Volcanic Plateau, North Island, New Zealand

Conservation status
- Naturally Uncommon (NZ TCS)

Scientific classification
- Kingdom: Plantae
- Clade: Tracheophytes
- Clade: Angiosperms
- Clade: Eudicots
- Clade: Asterids
- Order: Lamiales
- Family: Plantaginaceae
- Genus: Ourisia
- Species: O. vulcanica

Binomial name
- Ourisia vulcanica (L.B.Moore)

= Ourisia vulcanica =

Species of flowering plant

Ourisia vulcanica is a species of flowering plant in the family Plantaginaceae that is endemic to the North Island of New Zealand. Lucy Moore described O. vulcanica in 1961. Plants of this species of New Zealand foxglove are showy, perennial, rhizomatous herbs that can be hairy with non-glandular hairs or sometimes glabrous. They have crenate, ovate leaves. The flowers are usually in pairs in each node, with an irregular calyx, and a white irregular corolla. The calyx and floral bracts have non-glandular hairs. The corolla tube is yellow with three lines of hairs and a ring of hairs inside. It is only found in the Volcanic Plateau area and is listed as At Risk - Naturally Uncommon.

== Taxonomy ==
Ourisia vulcanica L.B.Moore is in the plant family Plantaginaceae. Lucy Moore described O. vulcanica in the Flora of New Zealand in 1961.

The type material was collected by Anthony Druce in 1944 at Tongariro, North Island, New Zealand, and the holotype is housed at the Allan Herbarium of Manaaki Whenua - Landcare Research.

Ourisia vulcanica plants are glabrous (hairless) to hairy perennials with flowers usually in pairs (or as many as three) per node, with white corollas, and three lines of yellow hairs and a ring of hairs inside the corolla tube.

O. vulcanica is similar to O. macrophylla, and they are both found in the Volcanic Plateau area of the North Island. A number of morphological differences distinguish O. vulcanica from O. macrophylla, including its rounded calyx lobes (vs. acute), irregular calyx (vs. regular), flowers usually in pairs in each node (range: 1–3) (vs. flowers in whorls of 3–12), and lack of glandular hairs (vs. glandular hairs present on some plant parts).

== Description ==
Ourisia vulcanica plants are perennial herbs. The stems are creeping, with opposite leaves that are tightly tufted along the horizontal stem. Leaf petioles are 3.0–22.0 mm long. Leaf blades are 6.9–26.8 mm long by 4.7–20.1 mm wide (length: width ratio 1.5–2.0: 1), usually narrowly ovate to broadly ovate, usually widest below the middle, with a subacute apex; cuneate base; and crenate edges. Leaves are glabrous or with few non-glandular hairs on both surfaces, and punctate on the lower surface. Inflorescences are erect, with hairy racemes up to 17.7 cm long, and with 1–4 flowering nodes and up to 8 total flowers per raceme. Each flowering node has up to 3 flowers and 2–3 sessile and sometimes clasping bracts that are usually narrowly lanceolate to narrowly ovate, and glabrous or hairy with non-glandular hairs near the edges. The lowest bracts are similar to the leaves, 9.4–19.4 mm long and 3.4–9.4 mm wide, and become smaller toward the apex of the raceme. The flowers are borne on a densely hairy pedicel that is up to 25.4 mm long and has non-glandular hairs only. The calyx is 5.6–8.6 mm long, irregular, with three lobes divided one-quarter or one-half the length to the base, and two lobes divided nearly to the base, with isolated to densely distributed non-glandular hairs. The corolla is 11.7–15.6 mm long (including the 5.4–9.4 mm long corolla tube), bilabiate, tubular-funnelform, usually glabrous or sometimes with a few non-glandular hairs near the base of the lpbes, and white on the outside (sometimes flushed red), and yellow and with three lines and a ring of hairs on the inside. The corolla lobes are 4.0–8.2 mm long, spreading, and usually obovate-spathulate. There are 4 stamens up to 11.5 mm long which are didynamous, with two long stamens that are exserted or reaching the corolla tube, and two short stamens usually reaching the corolla tube opening or exserted; a short staminode c. 0.5 mm long is also usually present. The style is 6.0–7.4 mm long, exserted, with an emarginate stigma. The ovary is 2.5–4.0 mm long and glabrous. Fruits are capsules c. 5.6 mm long and c. 4.2 mm wide with loculicidal dehiscence and pedicels up to 29.8 mm long. It is unknown how many seeds are in each capsule, and seeds are 0.7–0.9 mm long and 0.3–0.5 mm wide, with a two-layered, reticulate seed coat.

Ourisia vulcanica flowers from October to May and fruits from December to May.

The chromosome number of Ourisia vulcanica is 2n=48.

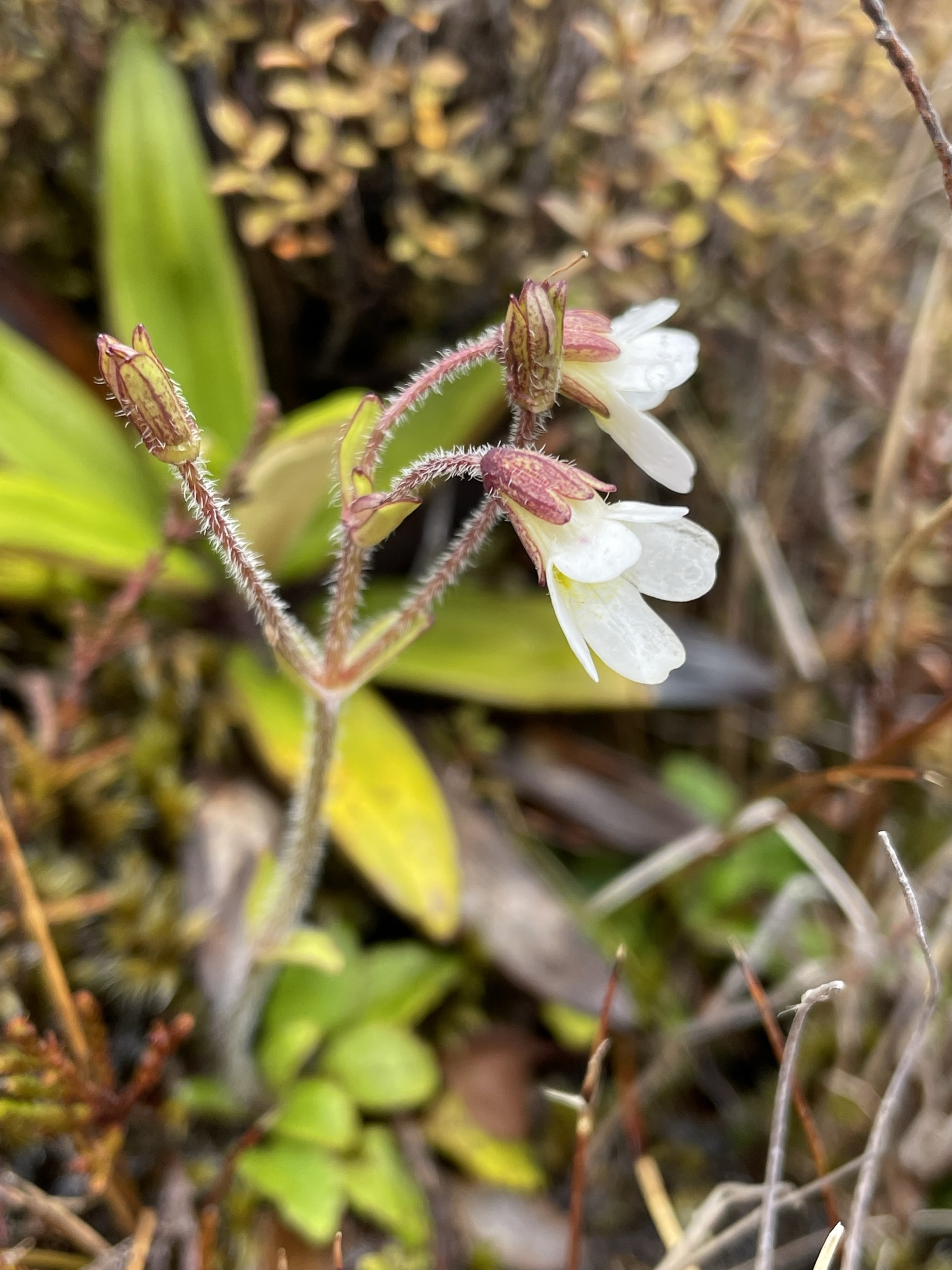
Inflorescence with pairs of flowers in each node, and non-glandular hairs

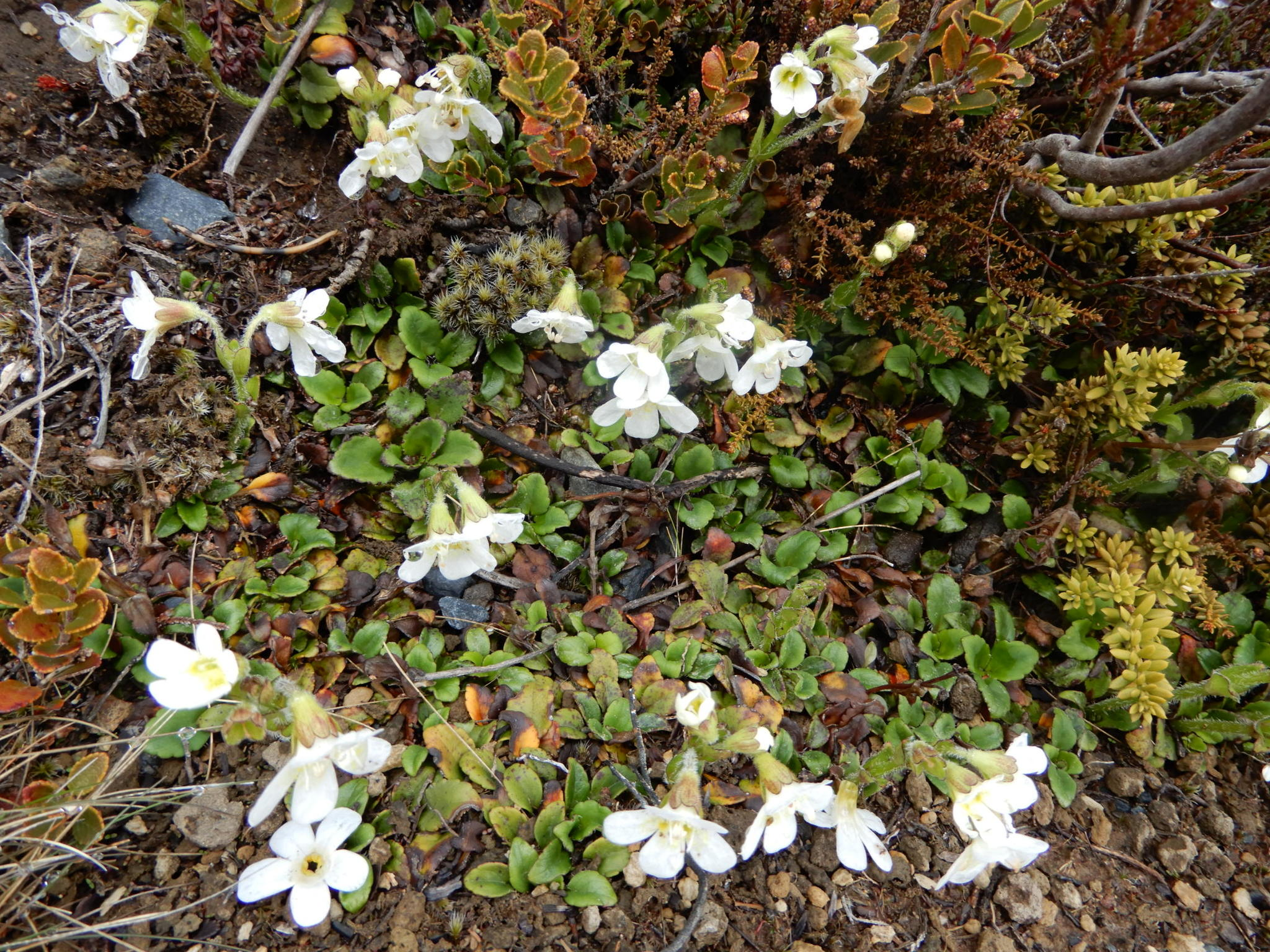
Flowering plants

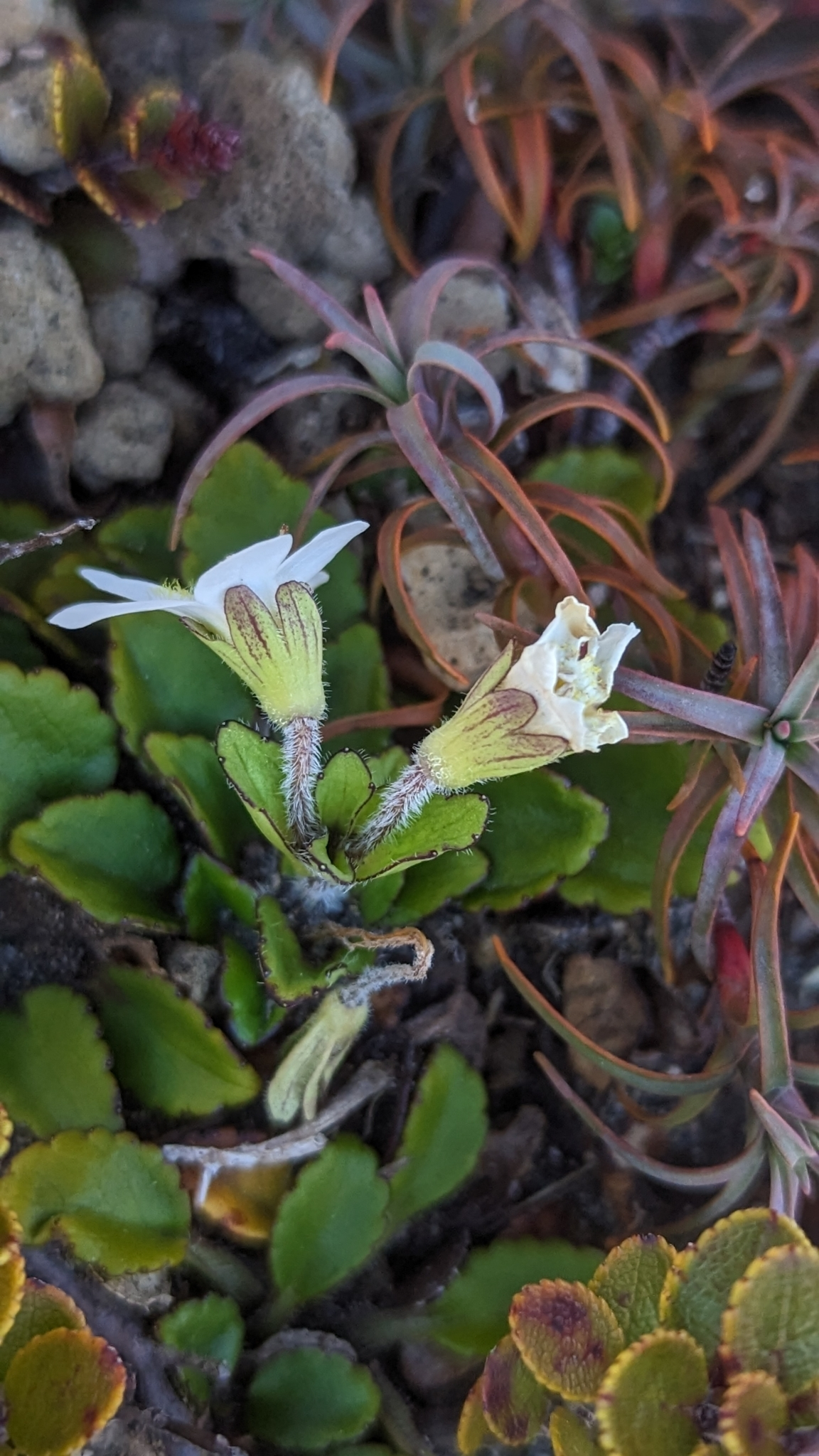
Flowers with irregular calyces

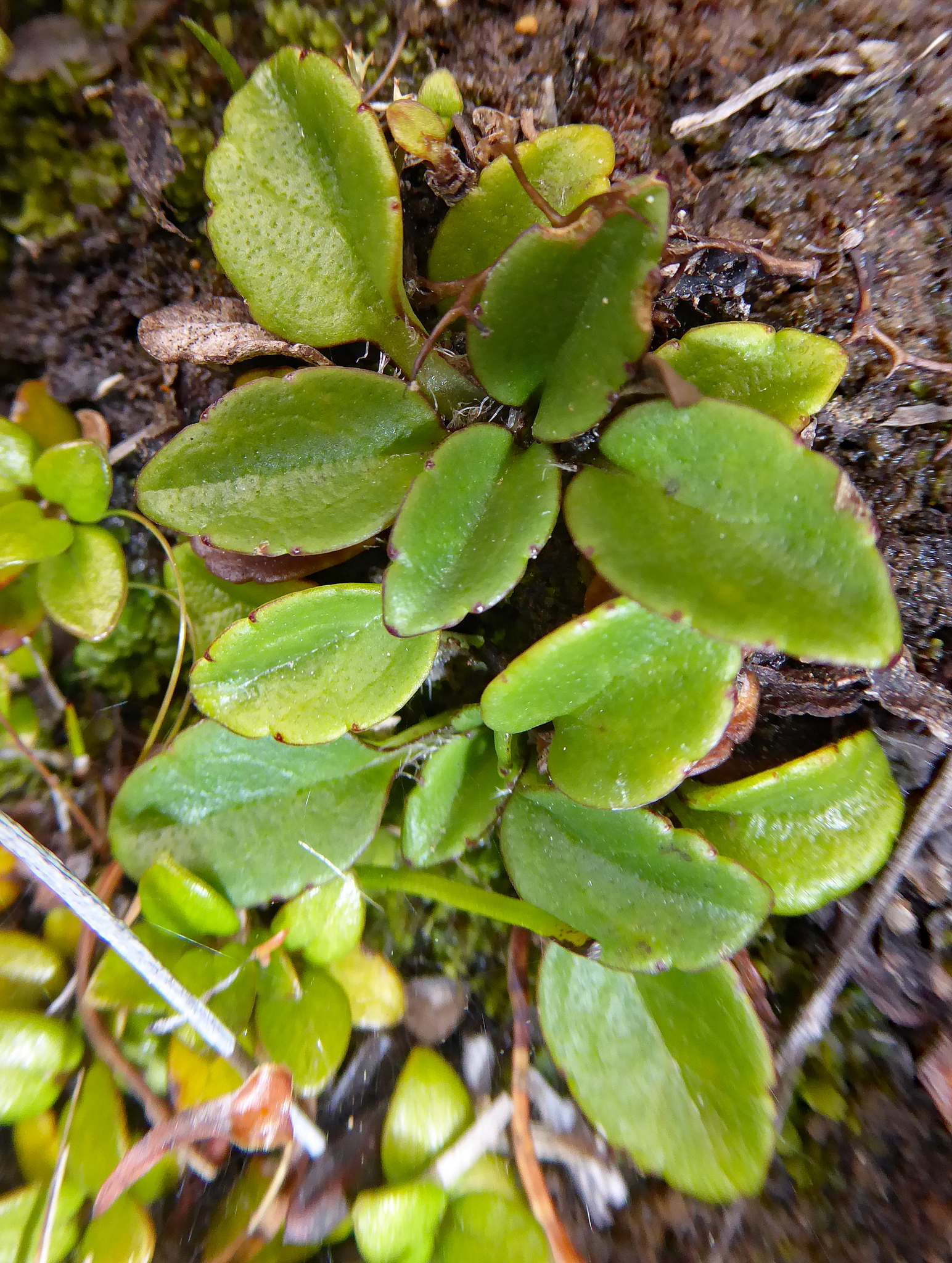
Leaves

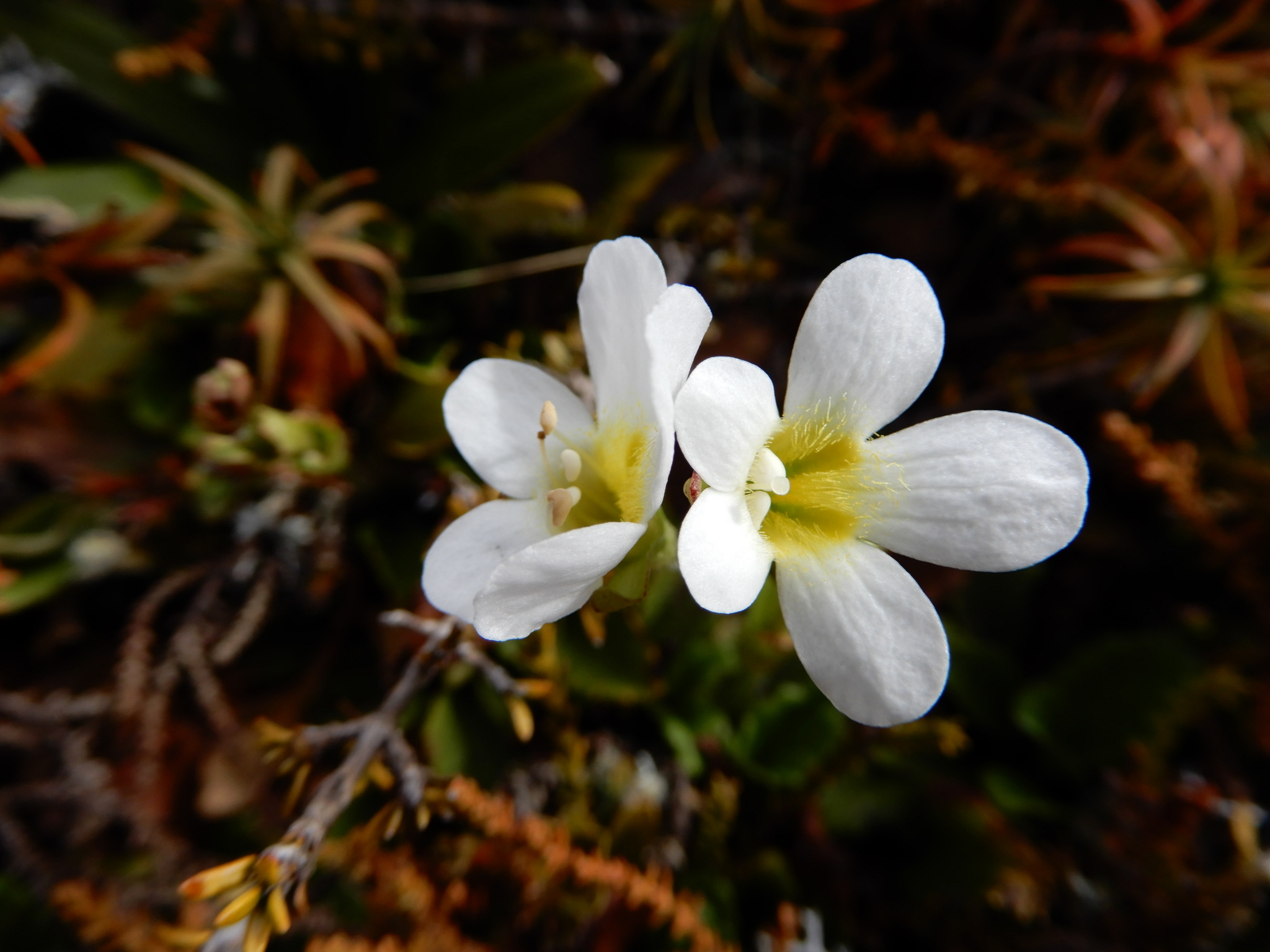
Close-up of flowers

== Distribution and habitat ==
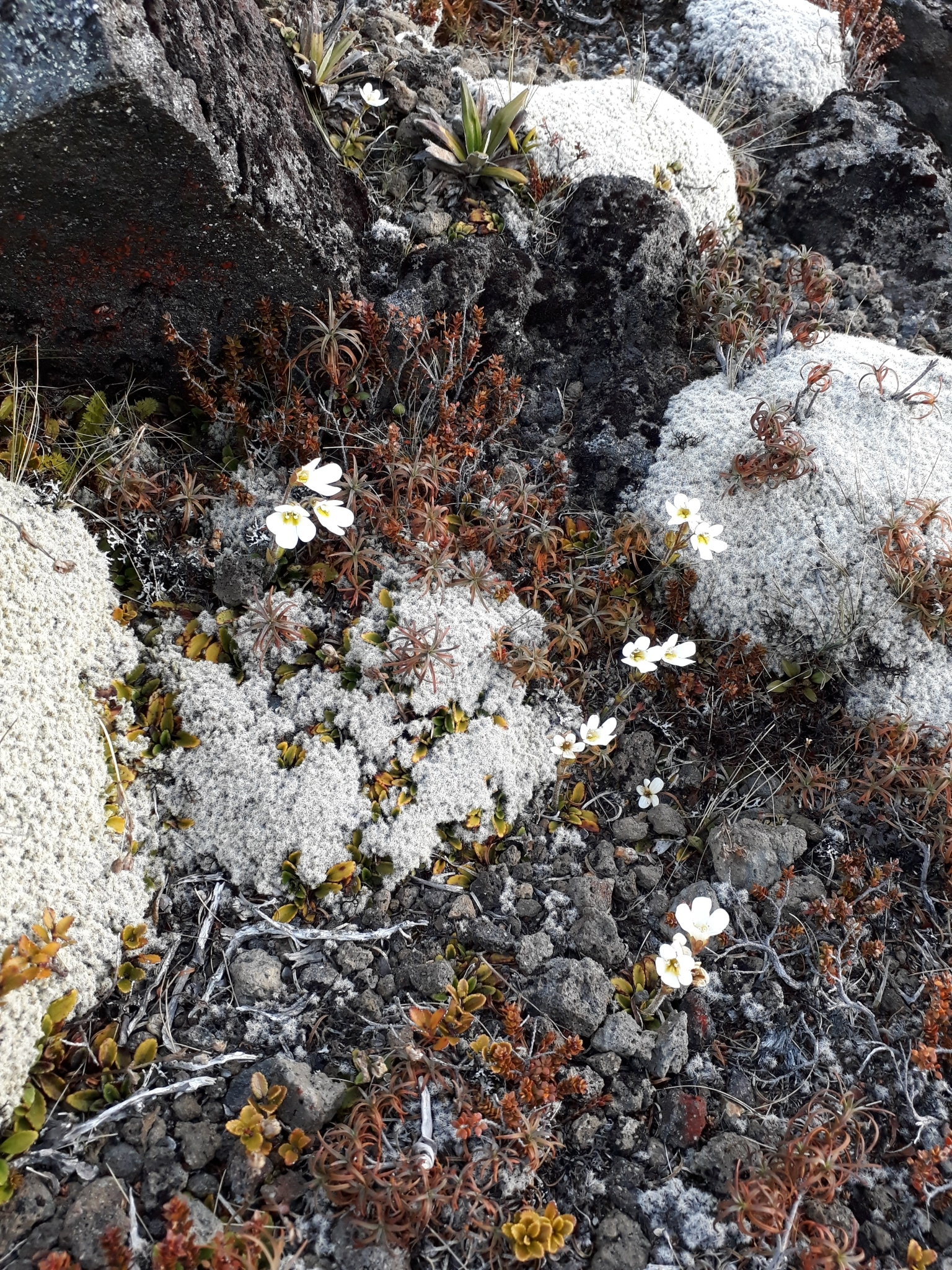
Flowering individuals in their native habitat with other herbs and grasses

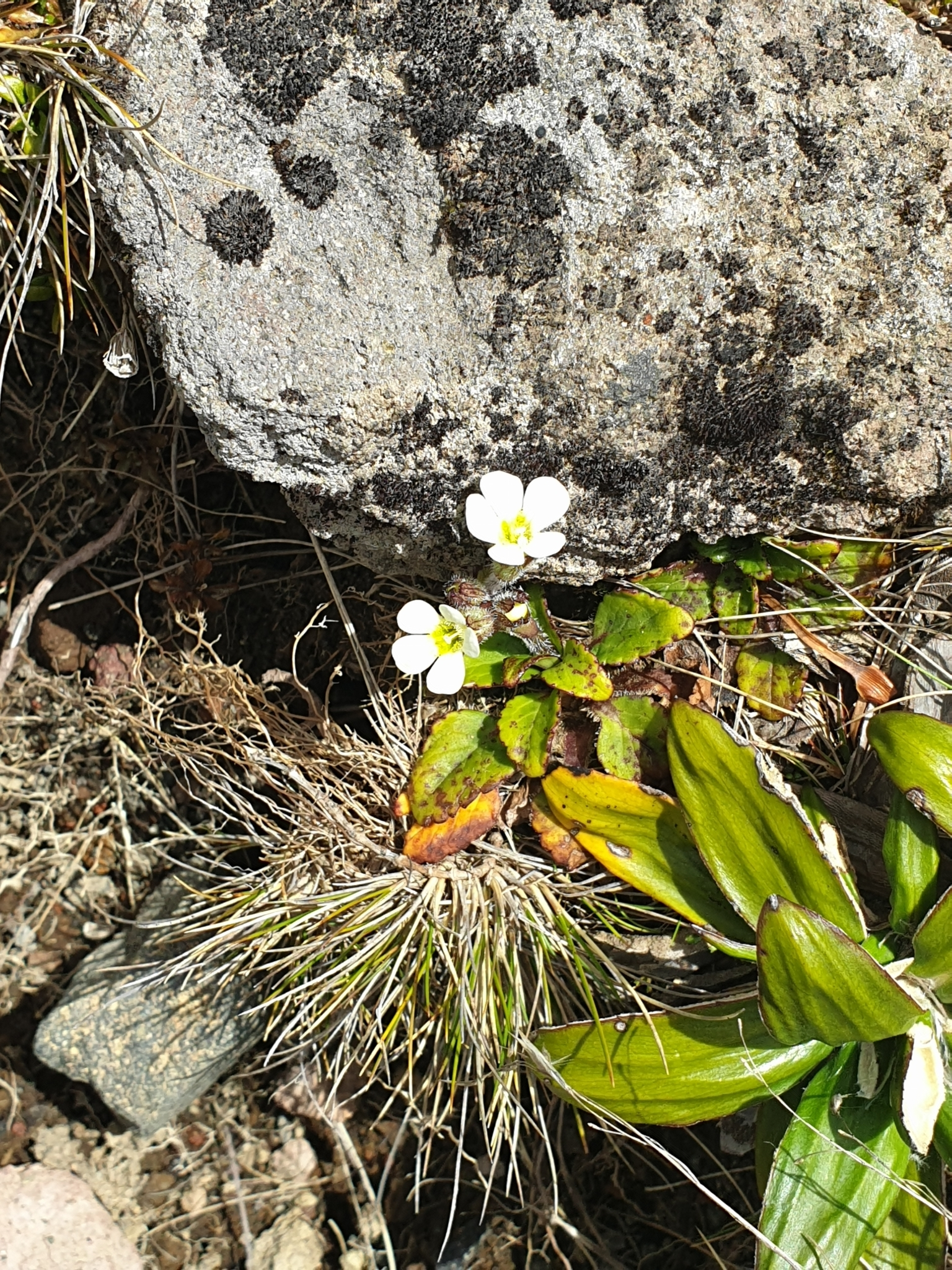
Flowering individual in its native rocky habitat

Ourisia vulcanica is endemic to the central North Island in the Volcanic Plateau area, including Tongariro National Park and the Kaimanawa Range.

This species is usually found at or above the bushline, in subalpine or alpine open or shaded, rocky habitats including tussock grassland or scrubland, on volcanic scoria, in dry or damp sites, from 750 to 1,800 m (2,460 to 5,910 ft) above sea level. It can be locally abundant.

== Phylogeny ==
One individual of O. vulcanica was included in phylogenetic analyses of all species of the genus Ourisia using standard DNA sequencing markers (two nuclear ribosomal DNA markers and two chloroplast DNA regions) and morphological data. In all analyses, the sampled individual belonged to the highly supported New Zealand lineage, and in the nuclear ribosomal and combined datasets, it was closely related to O. macrophylla, as well as the large-leaved species of New Zealand Ourisia, O. crosbyi and O. calycina.

In another phylogenetic study using amplified fragment length polymorphisms (AFLPs), five individuals were sampled of O. vulcanica. O. vulcanica was monophyletic with high support in the phylogenetic analyses of AFLP data. O. vulcanica was part of a highly supported clade that was in a larger clade of other large-leaved species, i.e. O. macrocarpa, O. crosbyi, O. calycina and O. macrophylla. The five sampled individuals of O. vulcanica however did not comprise one of the significant clusters in the Bayesian clustering analysis.

== Conservation status ==
Ourisia vulcanica is listed as At Risk - Naturally Uncommon in the most recent assessment (2017–2018) of the New Zealand Threatened Classification for plants.
