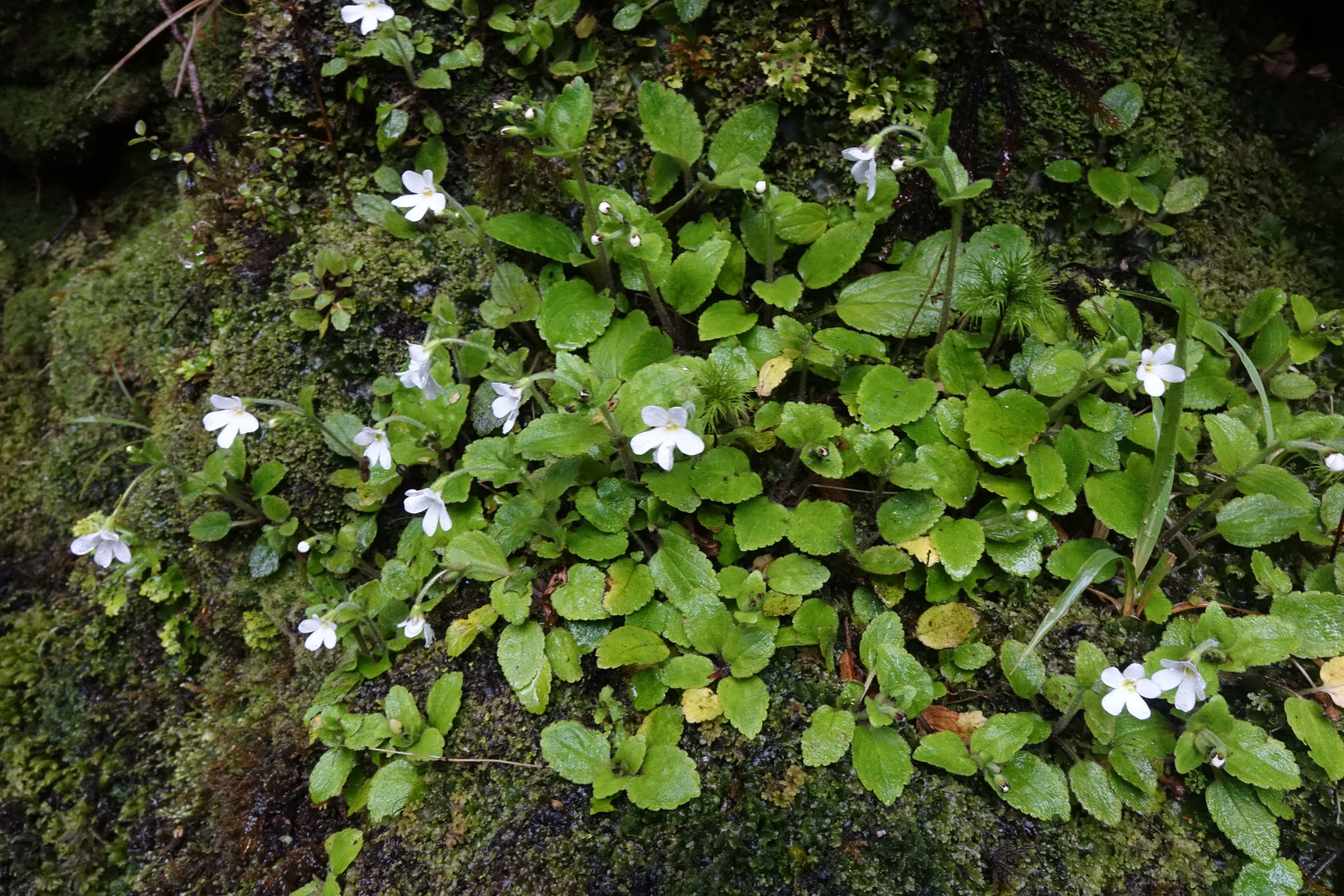
- Flowering O. crosbyi plant observed in Stewart Island, New Zealand

Conservation status
- Not Threatened (NZ TCS)

Scientific classification
- Kingdom: Plantae
- Clade: Tracheophytes
- Clade: Angiosperms
- Clade: Eudicots
- Clade: Asterids
- Order: Lamiales
- Family: Plantaginaceae
- Genus: Ourisia
- Species: O. crosbyi

Binomial name
- Ourisia crosbyi Cockayne

Synonyms
- Ourisia macphersonii Cockayne and Allan

= Ourisia crosbyi =

Species of flowering plant

Ourisia crosbyi is a species of flowering plant in the family Plantaginaceae that is endemic to the South Island of New Zealand. Leonard Cockayne described O. crosbyi in 1915. Plants of this species of New Zealand foxglove are showy, perennial, large-leaved, tufted, rhizomatous herbs that are hairy with non-glandular hairs. They have serrate, ovate, hairy leaves. The flowers are in whorls in each node, with a regular calyx, and a large, white irregular corolla. The corolla tube is yellow with three lines of yellow hairs inside. It is found in montane forests and is listed as Not Threatened.

== Taxonomy ==
Ourisia crosbyi Cockayne is in the plant family Plantaginaceae. Leonard Cockayne described O. crosbyi in 1915.

The type material was collected by Cockayne in Longwood Range, Southland, New Zealand. The lectotype was designated by Heidi Meudt and is housed at the Manaaki Whenua - Landcare Research Allan Herbarium.

Ourisia crosbyi plants are large, showy, hairy perennials with whorls of flowers with large white corollas, characters they share with another New Zealand species, O. macrophylla.

Ourisia crosbyi is morphologically most similar to another large-leaved, showy, hairy perennial New Zealand species, O. macrophylla, which also has whorls of flowers with large white corollas and three lines of yellow hairs.

A number of morphological differences also distinguish O. crosbyi from O. macrophylla, including its serrate or serrate-crenate leaves and bracts (vs. crenate), flowers that are not hairy on the outside (vs. hairy), and pedicels with non-glandular hairs only (vs. pedicels with glandular hairs).

== Description ==
Ourisia crosbyi plants are large perennial herbs. The stems are creeping, with opposite leaves that are tightly tufted along the horizontal stem. Leaf petioles are 5.0–145.0 mm long. Leaf blades are 14.2–72.5 mm long by 7.8–65.0 mm wide (length: width ratio 1.3–1.8: 1), usually narrowly ovate to ovate, widest below the middle, with an acute apex; usually truncate base; and serrate or serrate-crenate edges. Leaves are sparsely to densely hairy with non-glandular hairs on both sides. Inflorescences are erect, with usually glabrous racemes up to 49 cm long, and with 3–6 flowering nodes and up to 40 total flowers per raceme. Each flowering node has up to 12 flowers and 2–12 sessile and sometimes clasping bracts that are usually lanceolate to narrowly ovate. The lowest bracts are similar to the leaves, 13.6–45.1 mm long and 4.0–32.0 mm wide, and become smaller toward the apex of the raceme. The flowers are borne on a densely hairy pedicel that is up to 48.6 mm long and has non-glandular hairs only. The calyx is 4.2–7.8 mm long, regular, with all five lobes divided to the base, and with isolated to sparsely distributed hairs. The corolla is 14.5–19.9 mm long (including the 4.3–10.7 mm long corolla tube), bilabiate, tubular-funnelform, glabrous and white on the outside, and yellow and with three lines of yellow hairs on the inside. The corolla lobes are 4.3–9.9 mm long, spreading, and obcordate or obovate-spathulate. There are 4 stamens up to 9.4 mm long which are didynamous, with two long stamens that are exserted or reaching the corolla tube, and 2 short stamens included or reaching the corolla tube opening; a short staminode 0.6–0.9 mm long is also present. The style is 4.3–5.4 mm long, exserted or reaching the corolla tube opening, with an emarginate stigma. The ovary is 2.6–3.9 mm long and glabrous. Fruits are capsules 4.0–8.2 mm long and 3.0–5.9 mm wide with loculicidal dehiscence and pedicels up to 43.1 mm long. It is unknown how many seeds are in each capsule, and seeds are 0.5–0.9 mm long and 0.2–0.6 mm wide, with a two-layered, reticulate seed coat.

Ourisia crosbyi flowers from December to February and fruits from December to March.

The chromosome number of Ourisia crosbyi is 2n=48.

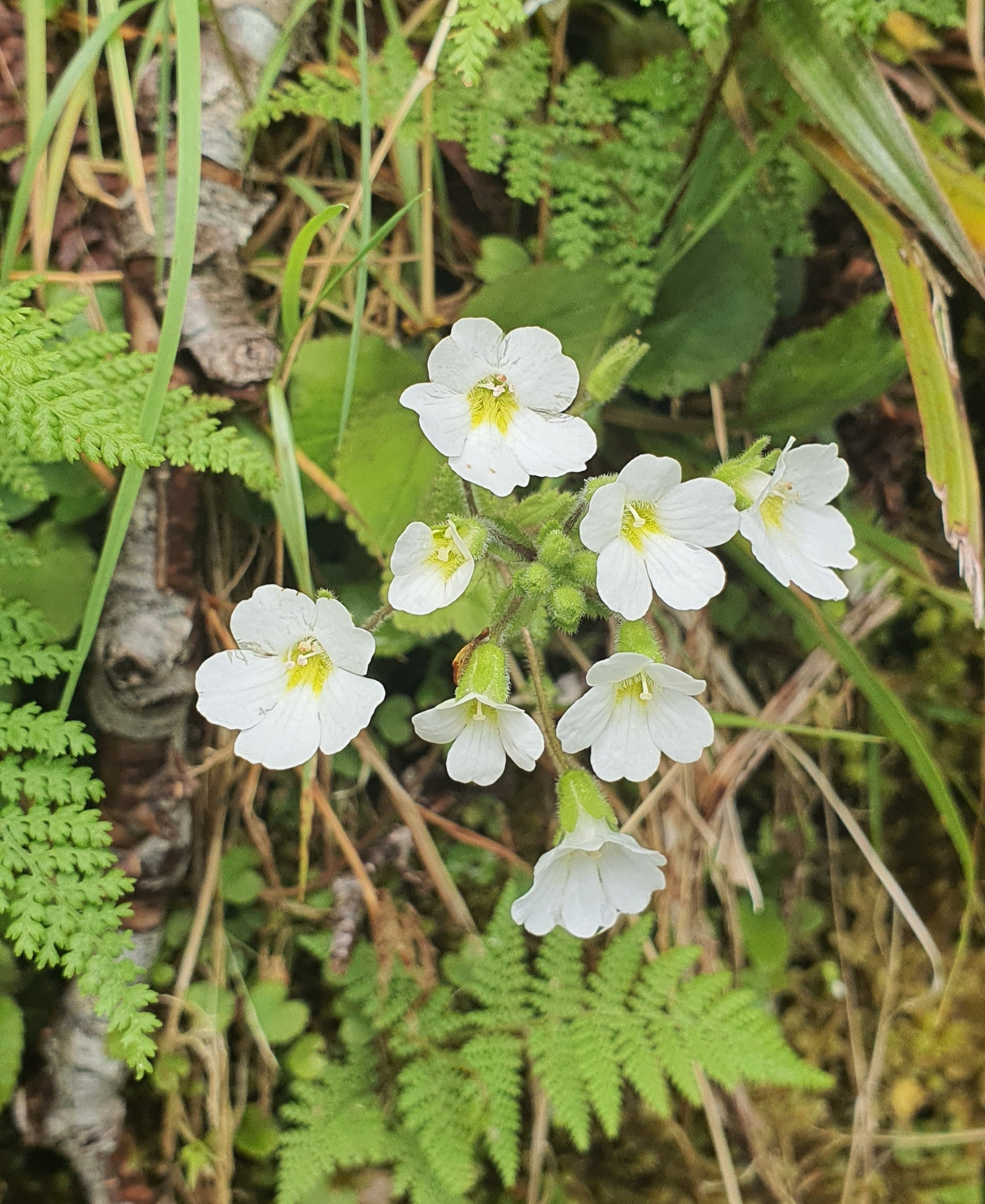
Close-up of flowers

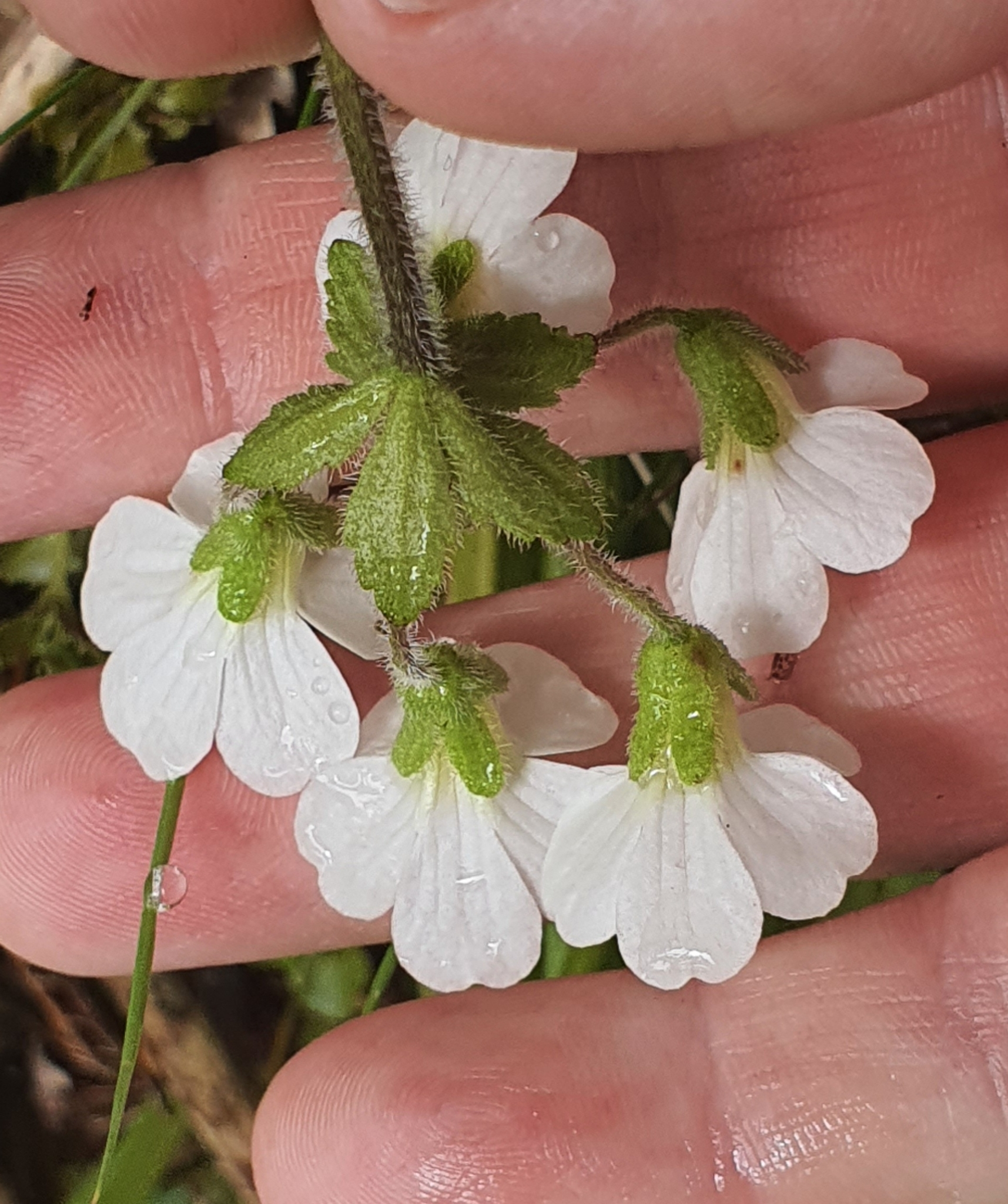
Underside of flowers showing non-glandular hairs on calyx and pedicel

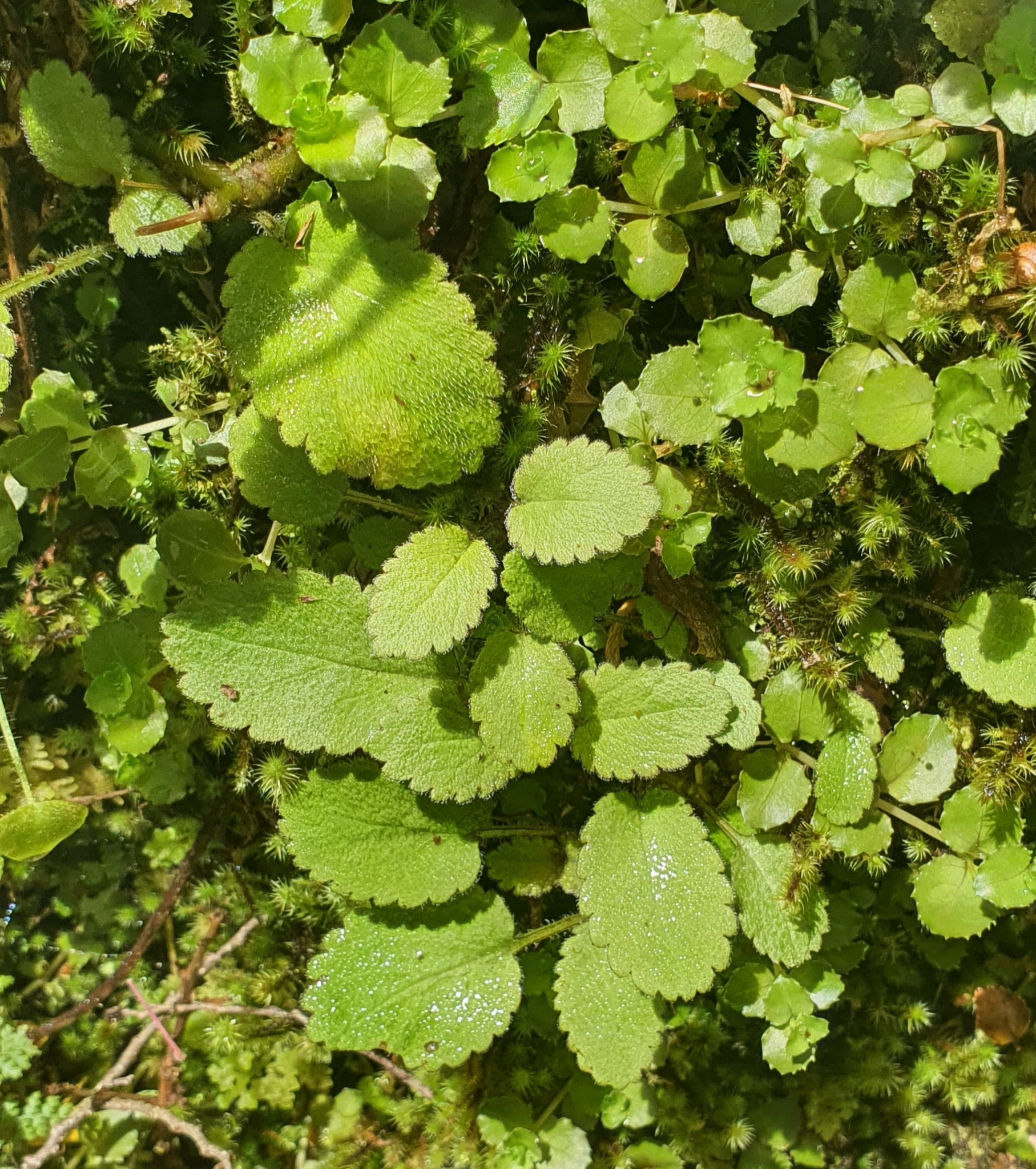
Leaves

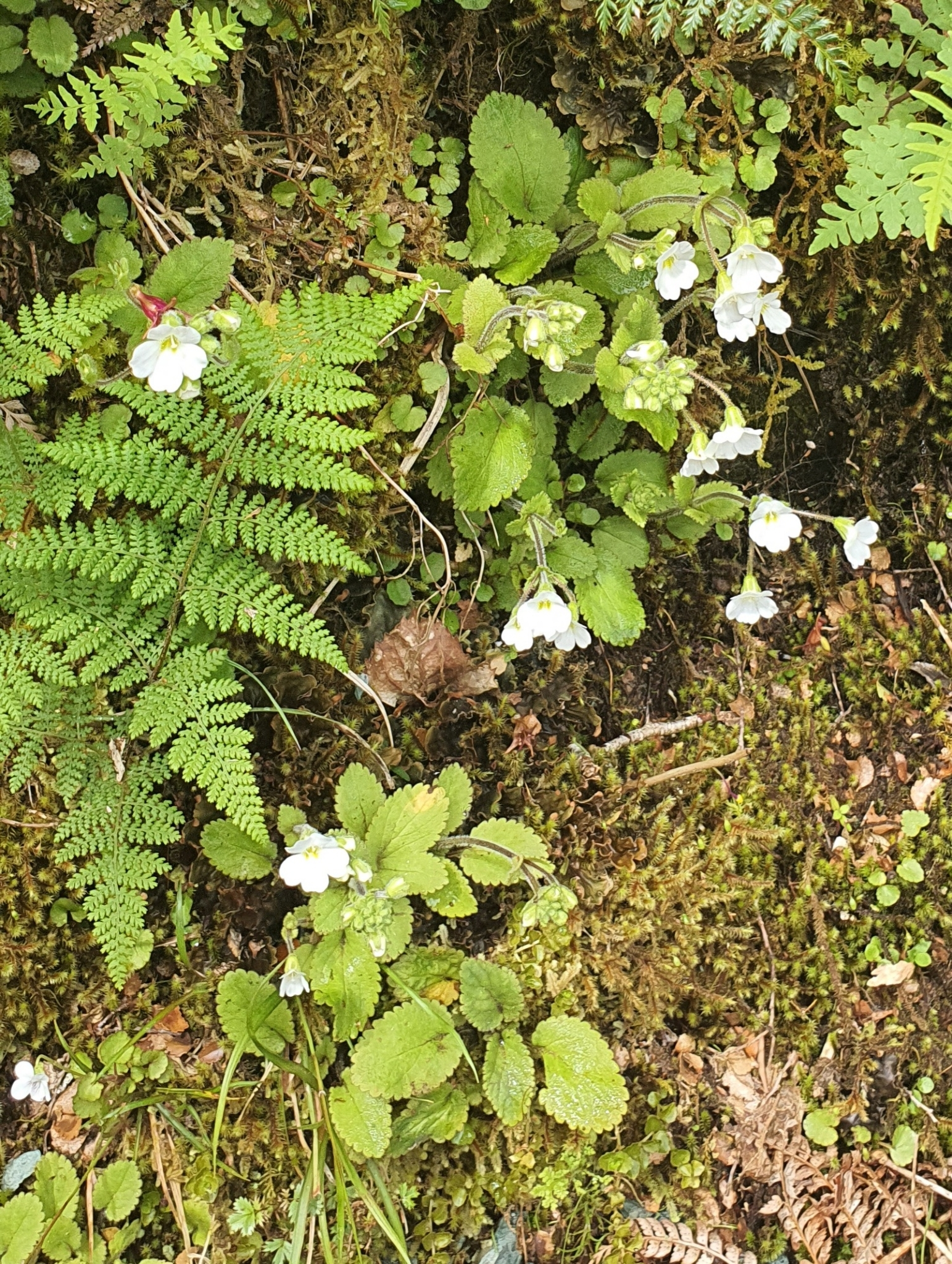
Habit

== Distribution and habitat ==
Ourisia crosbyi is endemic to southern South Island, New Zealand, in Westland, Southland, Fiordland and Stewart Island. It is found in montane southern beech forest below the bushline, in damp areas on the forest floor, or near streams or waterfalls, from 0 to 1,050 m (3,440 ft) above sea level.

== Phylogeny ==
One individual of O. crosbyi was included in phylogenetic analyses of all species of the genus Ourisia using standard DNA sequencing markers (two nuclear ribosomal DNA markers and two chloroplast DNA regions) and morphological data. In all analyses, the sampled individual belonged to the highly supported New Zealand lineage, and in the nuclear ribosomal and combined datasets, it was closely related to other large-leaved species, especially O. macrophylla, O. vulcanica and O. calycina.

In another phylogenetic study using amplified fragment length polymorphisms (AFLPs), all seven sampled individuals of O. crosbyi formed a highly supported clade that was in a larger clade of other large-leaved species, i.e. O. macrocarpa, O. macrophylla, O. calycina and O. vulcanica. The seven sampled individuals of O. crosbyi however did not comprise one of the significant clusters in the Bayesian clustering analysis.

== Conservation status ==
Ourisia crosbyi is listed as Not Threatened in the most recent assessment (2017–2018) of the New Zealand Threatened Classification for plants.
