= Pāora =

Pāora (Māori: [ˈpaːɔɾa]) or Paora (Māori: [ˈpaɔɾa]) is a given name and a surname. It is a Māori transliteration of the name Paul. Notable people with the name include:

== People ==
=== Given name ===
- Keith Paora Curry (born 1963 or 1964), New Zealand nurse
- Pāora Kīngi Delamere (1889–1981), New Zealand carpenter, boat builder, and Ringatū leader
- Pāora Kaiwhata (died 1892), New Zealand tribal leader
- Pāora Taki (died 1897), New Zealand tribal leader and warrior
- Pāora Temuera (1886–1957), New Zealand Anglican priest
- Pāora Te Potangaroa (died 1881), Māori prophet
- Paora Tūhaere (c. 1825–1892), New Zealand Māori leader
- Pāora Winitana (born 1976), New Zealand basketball player

=== Surname ===
- Ōtene Pāora (c. 1870–1930), New Zealand Māori leader
- Roka Paora (1925–2011), Māori language expert

== Organisms ==
- Paora (hatched 2019), brown kiwi

== See also ==
- Paora gusevae, a cricket species in the subfamily Nemobiinae
- Hato Pāora College, boys' school in New Zealand
