= Harry Allan =

New Zealand teacher, botanist, scientific administrator, writer (1882–1957)

Harry Allan CBE
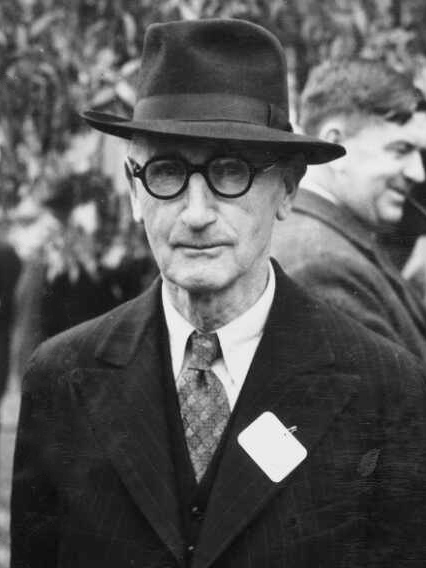
- Allan c. 1956
- Born: Harry Howard Barton Allan; 27 April 1882; Nelson, New Zealand
- Died: 29 October 1957 (aged 75); Wellington, New Zealand
- Education: Auckland University College
- Awards: Hutton Memorial Medal (1941); Hector Memorial Medal (1942)
- Scientific career
- Fields: Botanist
- Workplaces: Waitaki Boys' High School; Ashburton High School; Feilding Agricultural High School; Department of Scientific and Industrial Research
- Thesis: Vegetation of Mount Peel, Canterbury, N.Z. (1923)
- Author abbrev. (botany): Allan

Harry Howard Barton Allan CBE (27 April 1882 – 29 October 1957) was a New Zealand teacher, botanist, scientific administrator, and writer. Despite never receiving a formal education in botany, he became an eminent scientist, publishing over 100 scientific papers, three introductory handbooks on New Zealand plants, and completing the first volume of a flora in his lifetime.

Born in Nelson, he was educated at Nelson College and later Auckland University College, from which he graduated MA in 1908. He worked for many years as a teacher of English and agricultural studies at secondary schools around New Zealand. Throughout his teaching career, he became increasingly interested in and knowledgeable of botany, and wrote several articles in academic journals. He often collaborated and spoke with botanists, such as Alfred and Leonard Cockayne. For his lengthy botanical study of Mount Peel, he was awarded the degree of Doctor of Science (DSc) in 1923. He became a member of the Linnean society and the New Zealand Institute, and was appointed a systematic botanist for the Plant Research Station in 1928.

He spent twenty years working there, becoming head of the botany division when the research institute was split up in 1936 by the Department of Scientific and Industrial Research (D.S.I.R). Allan oversaw and contributed to vast amounts of research surrounding New Zealand's plants—particularly on grasses, pollen, and genetics. He retired in 1948 and was appointed a Commander of the Order of the British Empire (C.B.E) for services to botany in New Zealand in the King's Birthday Honours that year. In retirement he worked on volume one of Flora of New Zealand, the first in a series of books describing the introduced and endemic plants of New Zealand. He died before it was published in 1957, aged 75.

== Early life ==
Harry Allan was born on 27 April 1882 in Nelson, New Zealand. He was the youngest of Robert Allan, a draper, and Emma Maria Lewis' six children, and initially attended Nelson Central School. The headmaster there, Frederick Gibbs, introduced him to botany and he later won a town scholarship to Nelson College. There Allan excelled both academically and athletically, playing for the college in cricket and football, as well as winning prizes for literature and gymnastics. He also began part of his university degree (BA) there.

== Teaching and writing (1903–1928) ==
After graduating Nelson College he taught at various schools, beginning in 1903 in the mining town of Denniston, on the West Coast of the South Island. He later taught at King's College, in Auckland, as well as in Napier, before receiving a posting at Waitaki Boys' High School (Oamaru) in March 1907, as the "fourth assistant residential master." He joined in the second term of the year and became master of the preparatory department, in his first year overseeing its increase from 3 to 17 students. In 1908 he graduated from the University of Auckland, gaining his MA, and continued working at Waitaki. In 1913 Allan published an article in an academic journal, the New Zealand Journal of Agriculture, reporting the results of growing different potato varieties at Waitaki. There he later became the master of English in 1915, and, at the request of the Ministry of Education for more practical subjects to be taught, gave a course on agriculture. While teaching he often consulted Alfred Cockayne, who was at the time working for the Department of Agriculture, to help him with identifying weed and grass species. Through him he met his father, the botanist Leonard Cockayne, who often asked for weed specimens and would support his admission into the Linnean Society in 1917.

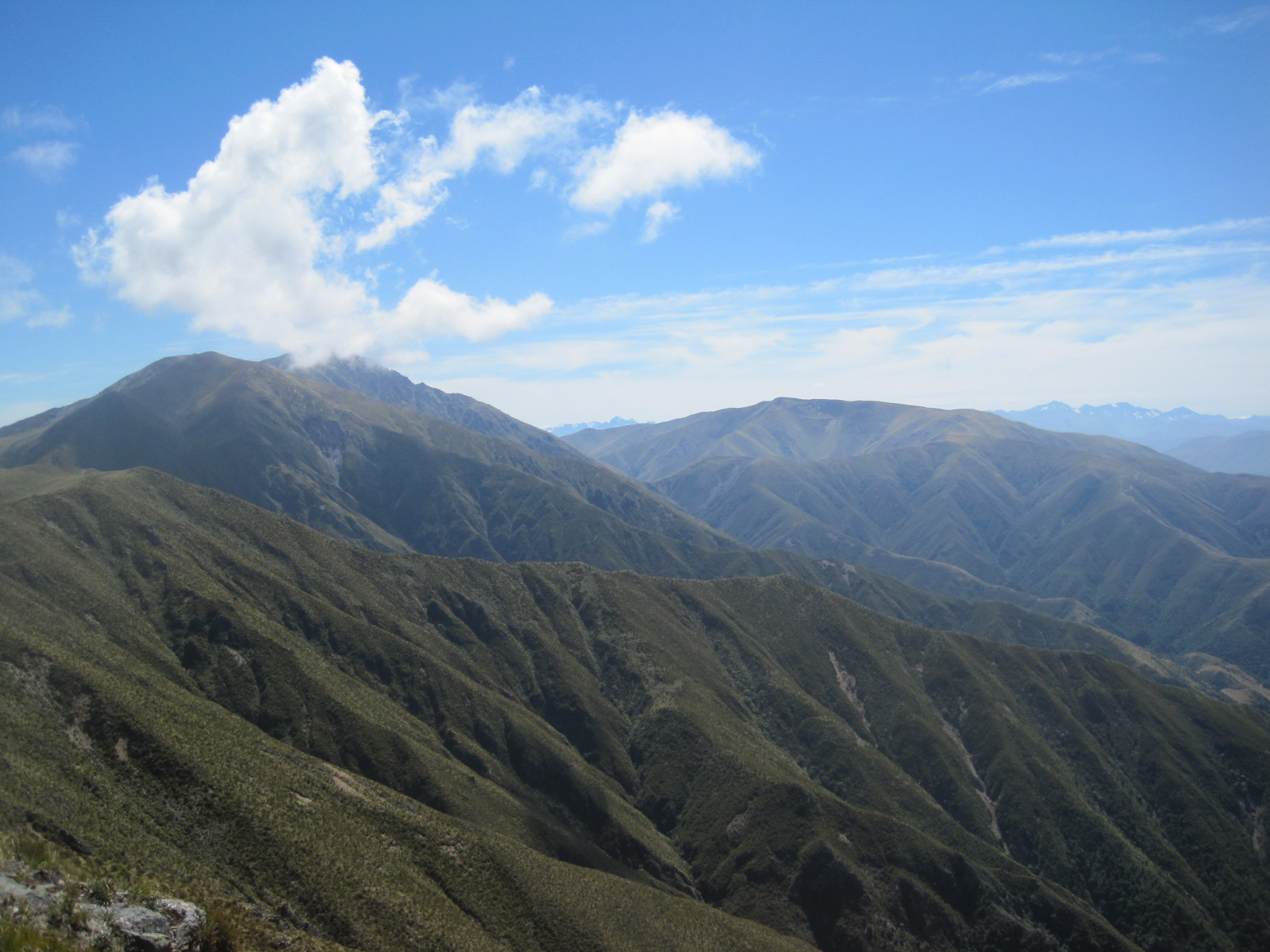
The vegetation of Mt Peel was the subject of Allan's thesis.

After leaving Waitaki at the end of 1916, he continued working—often with plants—at Ashburton High School, where he was agriculture master beginning in 1917. Allan also took charge of recording the results of experiments on the school farm. In 1917 the agricultural course he gave suffered from a lack of laboratory equipment and adequate space. At the end of the year Hugo Friedlander donated £500, equivalent to $29,990 in 2025, towards the building of a laboratory, which began early in 1918 and was finished in April of that year. Allan left Ashburton and began working at Fielding Agricultural High School, where he was English master, in early 1922.

The next six years he spent balancing his work teaching and his increasingly notable botanical research, much of it in collaboration with Cockayne. In 1923 he received his Doctor of Science (DSc) for a study of the flora of Mount Peel, a mountain in South Canterbury. In the introduction he writes: "I am deeply indebted to my friend and master, Dr. L. Cockayne, [...] for his unfailing interest and encouragement in all my botanical work, and for his help and criticism during the investigation." In writing his thesis he began collecting specimens of lichens, and started a correspondence with Gustaf Einar Du Rietz, who assisted in identifying them.

In 1927 Allan received a grant from the Royal Society of London to spend three months studying New Zealand plant hybrids in the field; from this he published several studies. Most involved cataloguing and identifying hybrids from around New Zealand, though he also performed crosses. Chief among his discoveries was the proof, using the genera Coprosma and Rubus, of the origin of a typical plant hybrid swarm. In 1927 he also published a monograph of the New Zealand members of the genus Hebe, describing several new species together with Cockayne. He was made a systematic botanist at the Plant Research Station (under the D.S.I.R), at Massey University in August 1928, retiring from teaching. In July 1928, prior to taking up his position at the institute, he published his first book: New Zealand Trees and Shrubs; How to Identify Them, a guide for the identification of New Zealand plants.

== At D.S.I.R (1928–1948) ==
Allan began working at the newly established Plant Research Station, an organisation formed by the Department of Science and Industrial Research (D.S.I.R), in August 1928. He worked as part of a committee, which included Cockayne and others, to research New Zealand agriculture, particularly fungi and grasses. Cockayne said of the institute: "there should develop an ever increasing stream of information of the highest value to the farming community." As part of his work there he published many articles on weeds, grasses, and naturalised plants in the New Zealand Journal of Agriculture, as well as writing two handbooks on those topics. His work often involved travelling around New Zealand to describe and collect species of plants. Biographer Ross Galbreath describes his focus on economic botany as being what allowed him to avoid the "factional disputes between scientists", which consumed the Research Station at the time. Through artificial selection of grasses, the Plant Research Station made the "grassland revolution", the turning of large areas of New Zealand to pasture, possible.

In 1930 Allan was made head of the botany section of the Australasian Association for the Advancement of Science and was sponsored by the Empire Marketing Board to travel to London. He attended the fifth International Botanical Congress, held that year in Cambridge, representing the New Zealand Institute, D.S.I.R, the State Forestry Service and the Research Station where he worked. At the conference, which had representatives from around 35 countries, he discussed hybridism in the New Zealand flora, the subject of his grant from the Royal Society. Allan also gave a talk at the Linnean Society, where he formally received his fellowship, and attended a conference of the British Science Association in Bristol. He visited Kew Gardens and the South Kensington Museum to study New Zealand plant specimens, (Note: Such as those taken by Georg Forster, Richard and Allan Cunningham, Daniel Solander, and Joseph Banks.) and also paid special attention to various grass species, such as Sporobolus × townsendii (syn. Spartina × townsendii), visiting the Essex coast where it grows rapidly.

In 1936 D.S.I.R took full control over the Research Station, turning it into the "Grasslands Division", (or the Botany Division) one of five newly created departments. Allan was made head of this department and was relocated in 1937 to Wellington where it became based. His work to create and administrate a robust botany division led the way to many important institutions and pieces of research. When World War II began in 1939 the division began large scale tests and cultivating of drug plants, predominately fox gloves and seaweeds, which they expected would be quickly in short supply overseas. The division also helped develop and expand large library and herbarium collections, which supported a plant identification service. Specific topics of study by the division included, as summarised by the botanist Lucy Moore: "New Zealand grasses their breeding systems and population genetics; a cytological survey of New Zealand plants; the study of pollen grains and spores and the peats and other organic deposits where they are preserved." His collections of lichens—for him a pastime—were used by the German lichenologist Alexander Zahlbruckner to help write his monograph of New Zealand lichens in 1941, which described 141 new species. He retired in 1948, after more than a decade as head of the botany division.

== Flora of New Zealand (1948–1957) ==
After retiring as head of the division in 1948, Allan continued working on his flora, which describes all of the plants of New Zealand. This still required collecting, identifying, and describing plants, and so in 1949 he took part in an expedition to Fiordland, which supplemented an earlier trip in 1946. He travelled to London again in 1950 to view herbarium specimens held at Kew Gardens, also attending the seventh International Botanical Congress in Sweden, and visiting Lapland with lichenologist Gustaf Einar Du Rietz.

== Death and legacy ==
When the laurel wreath was held high and the words “Harry Howard Allan, absens” were spoken, accompanied by gunfire, our thoughts went to his sick-bed at the other end of the world. His last great work will stand as a monument to a great personality, a famous botanist, and an unforgettable friend.

— Carl Skottsberg, 1958

Allan died in Wellington, on 29 October 1957, aged 75. He was survived by his wife and two children. After his death his colleague Lucy Moore, who had begun working with Allan on the flora in 1953, eventually completed and published the work as the first volume of Flora of New Zealand in 1961. Aside from the Flora, which Moore described as "his greatest monument", his legacy to botany has been determined by three things. First, his understanding of the importance of wild plant hybrids, both in botany, in which it progressed the idea of introgression, and to the New Zealand flora, in whose ecology they play a key role. Second, his three introductory handbooks on New Zealand plants, and finally, his overseeing of the Botany Division and the research that came out of it. A division, in Moore's words, where "each person was left rather free to produce the best possible results in his chosen field," a "welcome anomaly in the aridities of the Civil Service."

Flora of New Zealand, described by The Nelson Mail as a "botanical bible", is the "standard work on the subject"; the first volume contains descriptions and keys of 116 families, 290 genera, 1457 species, and 272 varieties. It was described by The Press in 1961 as "an essential volume to botanists and all who are connected in any authoritative way with the indigenous flora." Throughout his career, Allan described a total of 215 species and hybrids.

=== Awards and honours ===
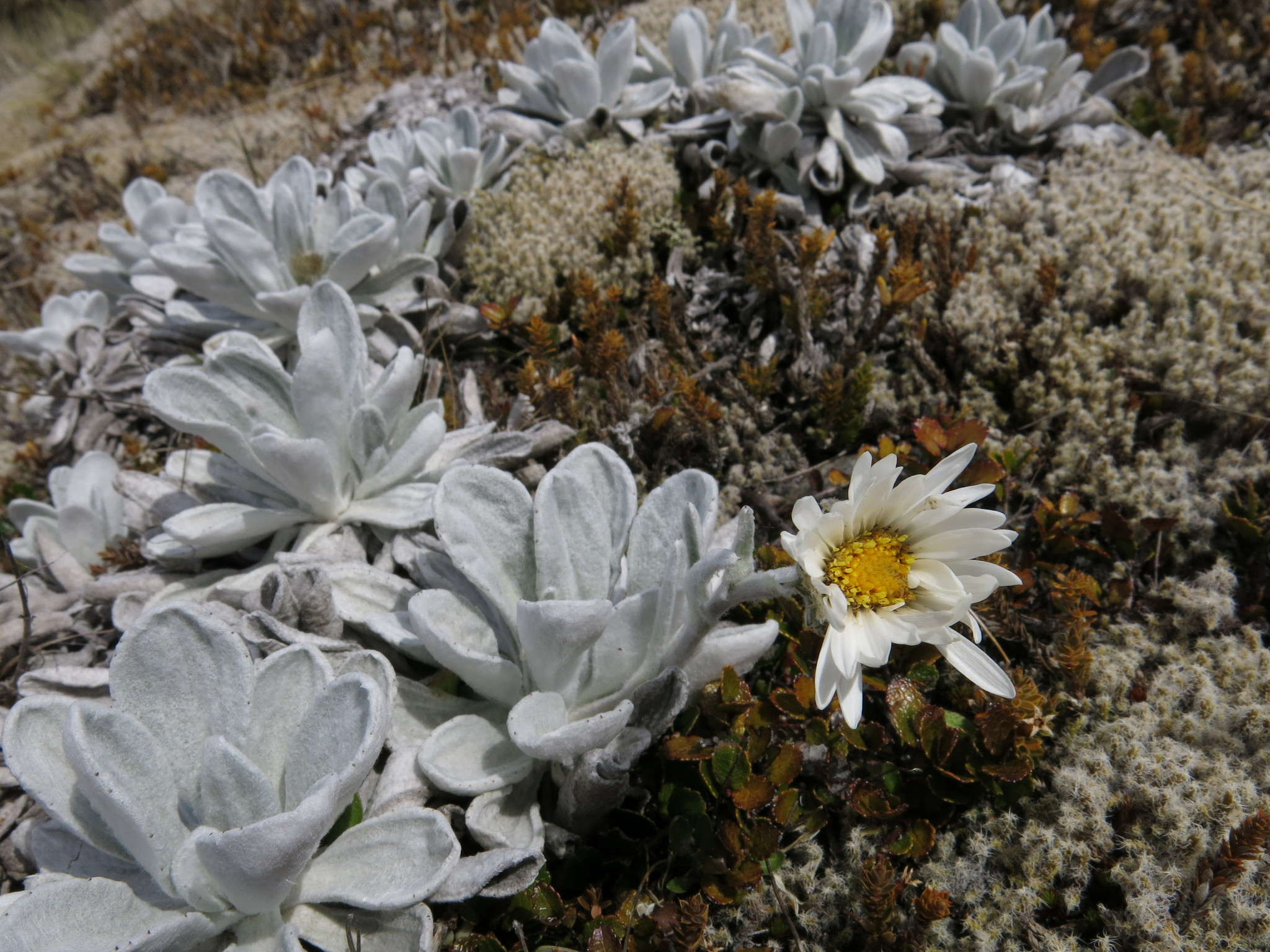
Celmisia allanii, described in 1935, was named after Allan.

Allan was elected a fellow of Linnean society in 1917, the New Zealand institute in January 1928, and an overseas member of the Royal Society of Sciences and Letters of Sweden in 1940—the first New Zealand botanist since Cockayne in 1929. In 1938 Allan was made a corresponding member of the Swedish Phytogeographical Society, for his work in the discipline, and earlier assistance given to the society's president when he visited New Zealand in 1927. In 1941 Allan was awarded the Hutton Medal for his botanical research, followed by the Hector Memorial Medal and Prize in 1942, and finally was appointed a Commander of the Order of the British Empire for services to botany in New Zealand in the 1948 King's Birthday Honours. After Allan's health began to decline, he was awarded the honorary degree of Doctor of Philosophy and Master of Arts in the University of Uppsala in May 1957, on the 250th anniversary of Carl Linnaeus's birth. In 2001 the Landcare Research Herbarium in Lincoln was renamed the Allan Herbarium in his honour.

The species Pertusaria allanii, Pseudocyphellaria allanii, Lembergia allanii, Frullania allanii, Gelidium allanii, Carex allanii, Chenopodium allanii, Celmisia allanii, Caloplaca allanii, and Azorella allanii are named after Allan.

== Personal life ==
Allan married Hannah Louise Arnold on 7 September 1909 and had two children: one daughter and one son. Moore described Allan as a man "quietly happy" with his life and satisfied in his work. He was a lover of books of many genres and could also speak Swedish, which he learnt to keep up with botanical news from the country. Shy and reserved, when he did speak he was "listened to with well-earned respect."

For himself he asked nothing except perhaps to be remembered as a true friend of botany. Of such a one Linnaeus wrote: “Botanicus verus desudabit in augendo amabilem scientiam.”

[The true botanist will sweat in advancing his beloved science]

— L. B. Moore, 1958

== Selected works ==
- Allan, H. H.; Cockayne, L. (1926). "The Naming of Wild Hybrid Swarms". Nature. 118 (2974): 623–624. Bibcode:1926Natur.118..623C. doi:10.1038/118623a0. ISSN 0028-0836. S2CID 4125412.
- Allan, H. H. (1926). "Vegetation of Mount Peel, Canterbury, N.Z. Part 1.—The Forests and Shrublands". Trans. Proc. R. Soc. N. Z. 56: 37–51 – via Papers Past.
- Allan, H. H. (1927). "Vegetation of Mount Peel, Canterbury, N.Z. Part 2.—The Grasslands and Other Herbaceous Communities". Trans. Proc. R. Soc. N. Z. 57: 73–89 – via Papers Past.
- Allan, H. H. (1927). "Illustrations of wild hybrids in the New Zealand Flora IV". Genetica. 9 (3): 145–156. doi:10.1007/BF01508116. ISSN 1573-6857. S2CID 46086154.
- Allan, H. H. (1928). New Zealand Trees and Shrubs and How to Identify Them. Government Printer – via Google Books.
- Allan, H. H. (1936). An Introduction to the Grasses of New Zealand. New Zealand. New Zealand: Government Printer – via Google Books.
- Allan, H. H. (1937). "A Consideration of the "Biological Spectra" of New Zealand". The Journal of Ecology. 25 (1): 116–152. Bibcode:1937JEcol..25..116A. doi:10.2307/2256338. JSTOR 2256338.
- Allan, H. H. (1937). "Wild species-hybrids in the phanerogams". The Botanical Review. 3 (12): 593–615. Bibcode:1937BotRv...3..593A. doi:10.1007/BF02872293. ISSN 0006-8101. S2CID 43713267.
- Allan, H. H. (1940). A Handbook of the Naturalized Flora of New Zealand. Government Printer – via Google Books.
- Allan, H. H. (1946). "Tussock Grassland or Steppe?". New Zealand Geographer. 2 (1): 223–234. Bibcode:1946NZGeo...2..223A. doi:10.1111/j.1745-7939.1946.tb00722.x. ISSN 0028-8144.
- Allan, H. H.; Moore, L. B. (1961). Flora of New Zealand: Vol 1. R.E. Owen, Government printer – via Google Books.
