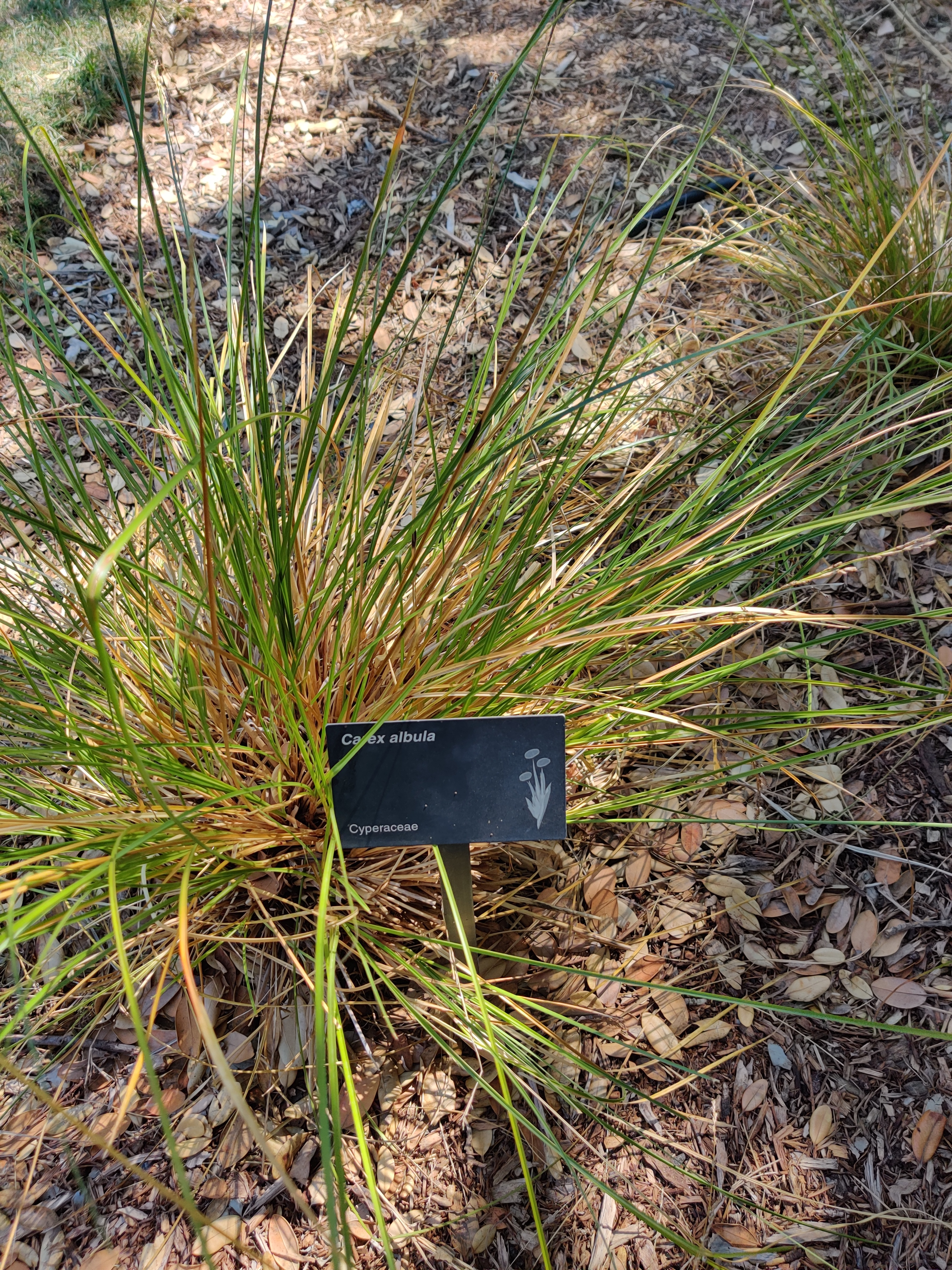
- Lectotype: AM AK2739-1

Conservation status
- Nationally Vulnerable (NZ TCS)

Scientific classification
- Kingdom: Plantae
- Clade: Tracheophytes
- Clade: Angiosperms
- Clade: Monocots
- Clade: Commelinids
- Order: Poales
- Family: Cyperaceae
- Genus: Carex
- Species: C. albula

Binomial name
- Carex albula Allan
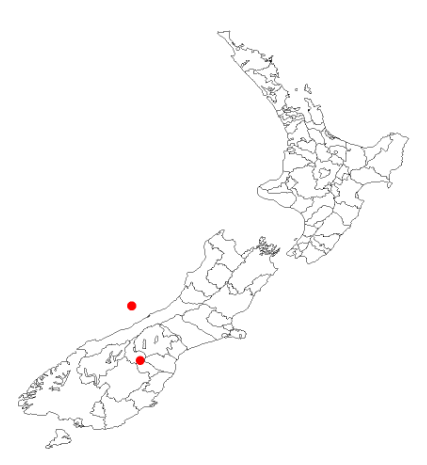
- Occurrence data from AVH

Synonyms
- Carex comans var stricta Cheeseman

= Carex albula =

Species of grass-like plant

Carex albula, common name white sedge, is a species of sedge (in the Cyperaceae family). It is endemic to the South Island of New Zealand.

According to Plants of the World online, it has no synonyms. However the New Zealand Plant Conservation Network lists Carex comans var stricta Cheeseman as a synonym.

== Description ==
It is a densely tufted sedge growing from 250 to 350 mm tall, and may be buff-coloured, an almost bleached white, or green or red. The culms are smooth and 50-200 mm by 0.5 mm, often having a deep groove. The leaves are numerous and the basal sheaths are dark brown to purple-red. The terminal spike is male with the other spikes being female.

It flowers from October to December and fruits from October to September and the nuts are dispersed by granivory and wind.

== Distribution and habitat ==
It is found in the South Island from the Mackenzie Basin, to Waitaki and Central Otago, on alluvial terraces, and slopes and on river flats.

== Conservation status ==
The IUCN Redlist declared its conservation status to be of "least concern" (LC). However, assessments under the New Zealand Threat Classification System (NZTCS), declared it to be "At Risk – Declining" (Dec) in 2013, and in 2017 to be "Threatened – Nationally Vulnerable" (NV).
