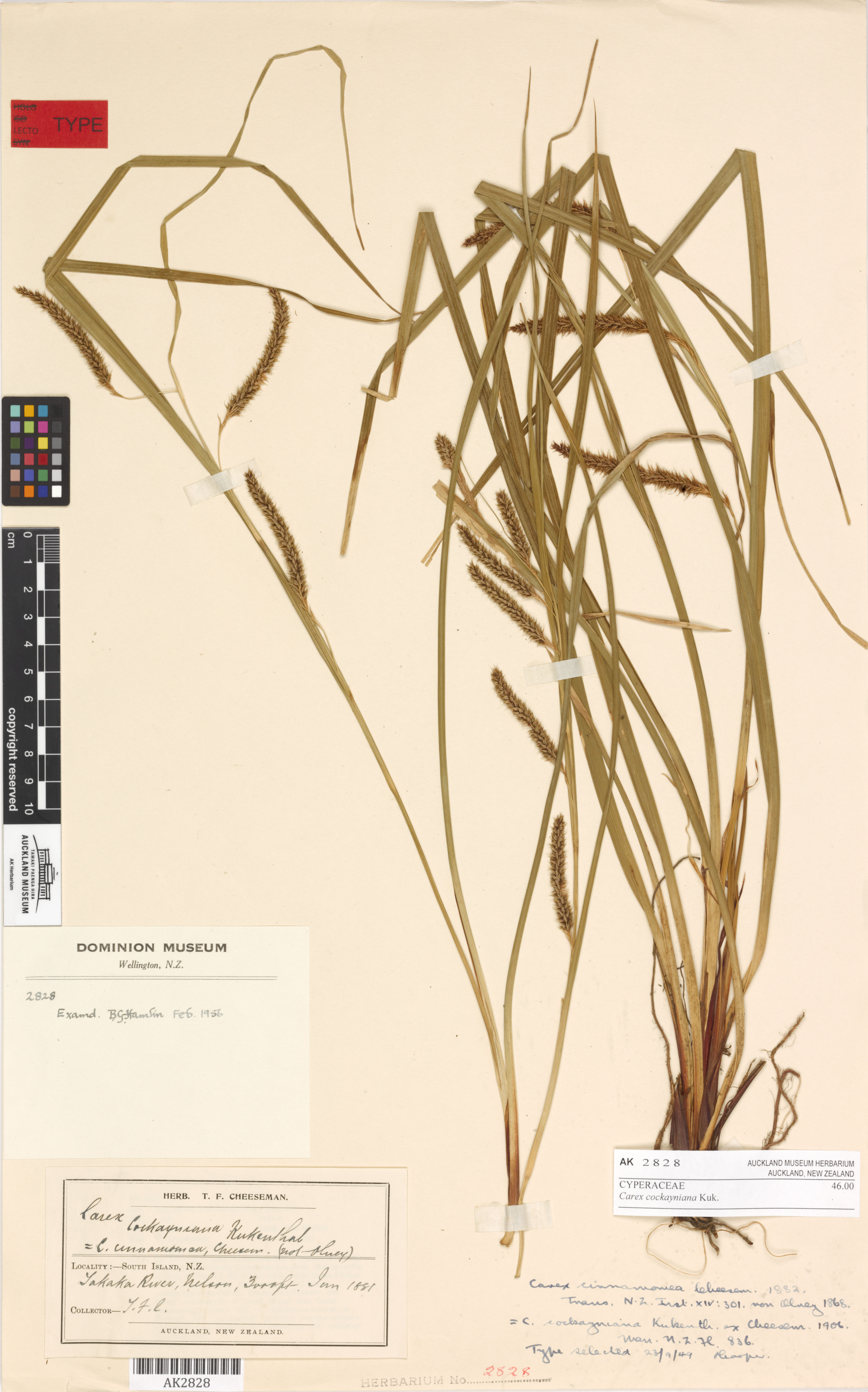

Scientific classification
- Kingdom: Plantae
- Clade: Tracheophytes
- Clade: Angiosperms
- Clade: Monocots
- Clade: Commelinids
- Order: Poales
- Family: Cyperaceae
- Genus: Carex
- Species: C. cockayneana

Binomial name
- Carex cockayneana Kük., 1906

= Carex cockayneana =

Species of sedge

Carex cockayneana, also known as Cockayne's sedge, is a tussock-forming perennial in the family Cyperaceae, that is native to the North Island of New Zealand.

The specific epithet honours the New Zealand botanist Leonard Cockayne.

== See also ==
- List of Carex species
