= Claude Anaru =

New Zealand politician and community leader (1901–1977)

Karauria Tiweka Anaru OBE JP (2 June 1901 – 30 October 1977), often known as Claude Anaru, was a New Zealand interpreter, law clerk, local politician and community leader. Of Māori descent, he identified with the Te Whānau-ā-Apanui iwi. He was born in Raukokore, Bay of Plenty, New Zealand, on 2 June 1901.

In 1953, Anaru was awarded the Queen Elizabeth II Coronation Medal. In the 1957 Queen's Birthday Honours, he was appointed an Officer of the Order of the British Empire, for services to the Māori people.
