= Anna E. Brown =

New Zealand book designer and lecturer

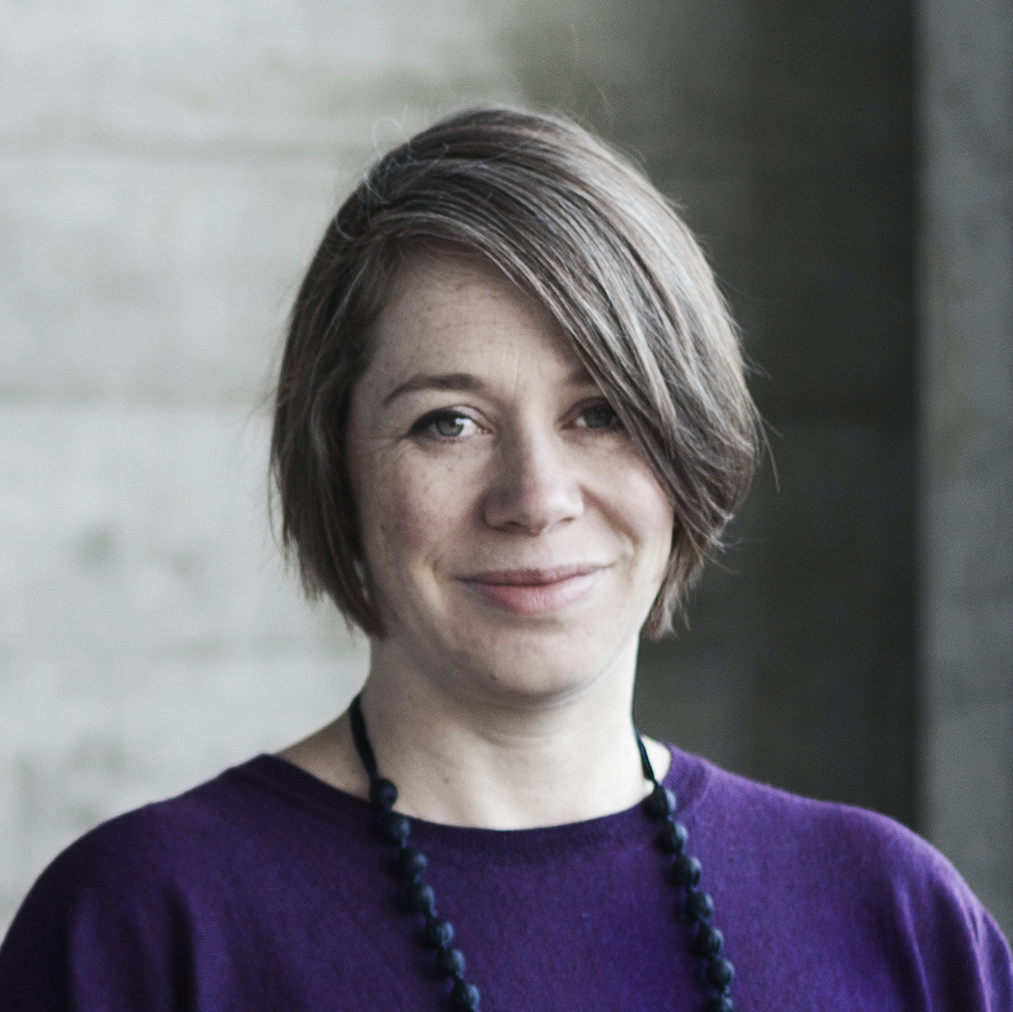
- Brown in 2016

Academic background
- Education: Massey University
- Thesis: The endless book - exploring the online, offline (2012)
- Academic advisors: Mark Bradford, Christopher David Bennewith, Aukje Thomassen

Anna E. Brown is a New Zealand academic, and is a full professor at Massey University, specialising in book design, and design for the public good.

== Academic career ==
Brown completed a Bachelor's degree with Honours in English and History at Victoria University of Wellington, a Bachelor's in Design from the University of Canterbury and a Master's degree at Massey in 2012, with a thesis titled The endless book - exploring the online, offline. Brown ran her own design business before joining the faculty of Massey University, rising to full professor in 2022.

Brown is "interested in how conversations and community engagement can drive social change". She founded and leads the Toi Āria: Design for Public Good research centre at Massey. Researchers at Toi Āria developed the 'Comfort Board' approach to participatory design decision-making. The methodology was used in research commissioned by the Digital Council of Aotearoa, to assess how members of affected groups thought automated decision-making should be used in government processes. The research resulted in seven recommendations to government.

Brown is chair of Massey University Press. She is a principal investigator in Te Punaha Matatini Centre of Research Excellence, and an associate investigator in QuakeCoRE, the New Zealand Centre for Earthquake Resilience.

Brown's book designs have won awards. Brown designed Extraordinary Anywhere, which won the award for the best non-illustrated book at the Publishers Association of New Zealand (PANZ) Book Design Awards in 2017. Conversātiō: In the company of bees, by Anne Noble with Zara Stanhope and Anna Brown, was published in 2022 and won multiple design awards in Australia and New Zealand, including Best Book at the 2022 PANZ Book Design Awards, and Best in Class Award at the 2022 Australian Good Design Awards.

== Selected works ==
- Marion Lara Tan; Brown, Anna; Stock, Kristin; Julia S. Becker; Kenney, Christine; Emily Lambie; Alicia Cui; Raj Prasanna (13 November 2023), ‘Balancing human needs with technology’ 1 —a design-led approach for exploring an earthquake early warning system in Aotearoa New Zealand, pp. 124–140, doi:10.4324/9781003306771-9, Wikidata Q124038958
- Brown, Anna; Simon Mark; Margaret Maile Petty (2020). "Assessing the economic value of New Zealand design". Journal of Design Business & Society. 6 (1): 7–20. doi:10.1386/dbs_00002_1. Wikidata Q124038959.
- Rachelle A Martin; Angelo P Baker; Kirsten Smiler; et al. (2022). "Flourishing together: research protocol for developing methods to better include disabled people's knowledge in health policy development". BMC Health Services Research. 22 (1): 1252. doi:10.1186/s12913-022-08655-2. PMC 9575235. PMID 36253852. Wikidata Q124039729.
- Marion Lara Tan; Julia S. Becker; Stock, Kristin; Raj Prasanna; Brown, Anna; Kenney, Christine; Alicia Cui; Emily Lambie (2022). "Understanding the social aspects of earthquake early warning: A literature review". Frontiers in Communication. 7. doi:10.3389/fcomm.2022.939242. Wikidata Q124039730.
