= Waikura River =

Waikura River is the name of two rivers in the Gisborne Region of New Zealand.

- Waikura River (Raukokore River tributary)
- Waikura River (Hangaroa River tributary)
