= Papatea Bay =

Bay in the North Island of nNew Zealand

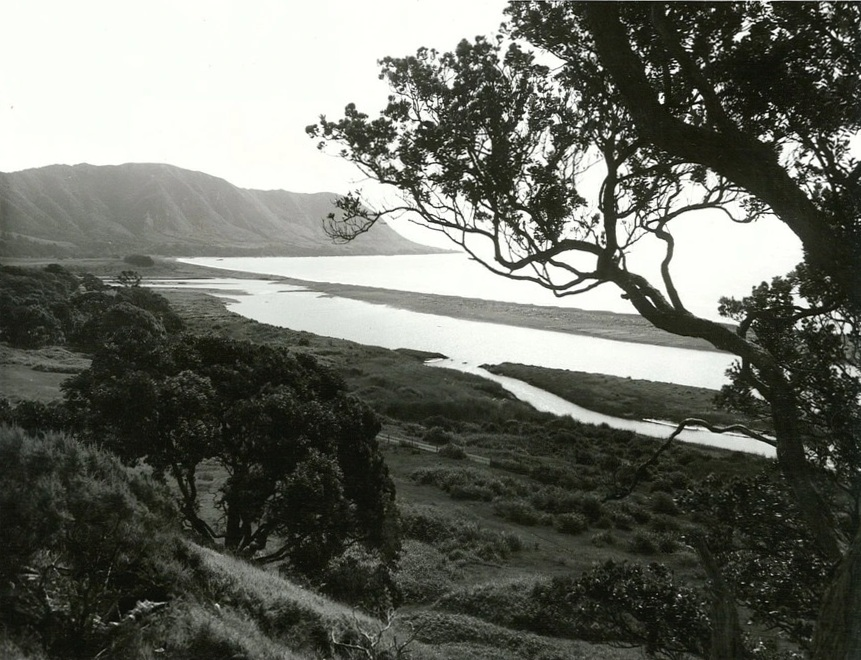
- Pōhutukawa trees at Papatea Bay, December 1975
- Interactive map of Papatea Bay
- Location: Ōpōtiki District, North Island
- Coordinates: 37°39′18″S 177°50′24″E
- River sources: Raukokore River, Te Waiti Stream, Wairuru Stream
- Surface elevation: 0 m (0 ft)

Papatea Bay is one of numerous small bays which lie between the eastern end of the Bay of Plenty and East Cape in the northeast of New Zealand's North Island. A wide, gently curving bay, it lies approximately halfway between East Cape and Ōpōtiki. The small settlement of Raukokore lies on the shore of the bay.
