= Vernon Griffiths =

English-born New Zealand music composer, lecturer and teacher (1894–1985)

Vernon Griffiths OBE
- Born: Thomas Vernon Griffiths; 22 June 1894; West Kirby, Cheshire, England
- Died: 23 November 1985 (aged 91); Christchurch, New Zealand
- Education: University of Cambridge (BMus); Canterbury College (DMus)
- Occupations: Conductor; composer; lecturer; teacher
- Spouse: Daphne Spear
- Children: 5
- Awards: Citation for Services to Music (1980)

Thomas Vernon Griffiths OBE (22 June 1894–23 November 1985) was an English-born New Zealand conductor, composer, lecturer and music teacher. Known for his dedication to music in schools and the community, Griffiths promoted music education, school music and was active in community music. He composed pieces for schools, churches and amateur musicians.

== Early life and education ==
Griffiths was born in West Kirby, Cheshire, England, on 22 June 1894. He spent his childhood in Norwich attending Norwich Grammar School. His father was an Anglican minister who served in poor and deprived areas. He began his working life as a bank clerk before serving as an officer during World War I. Post-war, he won an organ scholarship to the University of Cambridge, graduating with a MusB in 1922.

== Career ==
From 1922 to 1926, Griffiths taught at schools in Somerset and Canterbury before emigrating to New Zealand to become lecturer in music at the Christchurch Teachers' Training College.

In 1933, after losing his position at the Training College due to retrenchment, he became music teacher at King Edward Technical College in Dunedin. In both positions he had fostered music making. In Christchurch he instituted group tuition for children in low cost Saturday morning classes. In Dunedin, believing that everyone should have the opportunity to make music, he began orchestras, military bands and chamber groups. All 800 students at King Edward participated in orchestras, military bands or choirs as he believed in the "regenerative power music possessed". Griffiths' programmes for school music were adopted throughout New Zealand schools and his publication, An experiment in school music making, received international recognition.

From 1936 until April 1939, Griffiths was the choirmaster and organist at St. Joseph's Cathedral, Dunedin.

Griffiths graduated with DMus in 1937 and became a professor of music at Canterbury University College in 1942. In 1946, he began the Addington Railway Workshops Choir, which was supported by Bob Semple, the Minister of Works.

In 1941, Griffiths compiled the sixth edition of the Dominion Song Book and contributed to later editions.

He became professor emeritus in 1961 and received an honorary doctorate in music from the University of Canterbury in 1975.

== Honours and awards ==
In the 1957 Queen's Birthday Honours, Griffiths was appointed an Officer of the Order of the British Empire. The Composers Association of New Zealand awarded him a Citation for Services to Music in 1980.

== Personal life ==
Griffiths married Daphne Spear in Christchurch in 1944 and they had five children.

He died in Christchurch on 23 November 1985, aged 91.

== Selected works ==
=== Compositions and arrangements ===
- Missa simplex : in D major (1944)
- Catholic hymn book : melodies harmonised for singing in two, three or four parts; with descants - arrangements (1947)
- A first year course of 12 orchestral exercises or pieces : specially intended for school orchestras and amateur instrumental music groups : orchestral exercise no. 3 : March in D : based on two French folk songs (1947)
- Super omnia ligna cedrorum : for 3 part male voice choir (1950)
- Peace and war : for mixed chorus and brass band (or mixed chorus and pianoforte, or organ) (1956)
- Recessional on 'St. George' : for organ (1956)
- Short suite for organ (1959)
- School songs : for Peter : a boy's song (1960)
- An ode of thanksgiving : for SATB chorus and string orchestra (1962)
- Meditation on Maria zu lieben (1964) - for organ

=== Books ===
- Twenty talks to children on musical subjects : for the use of teachers and training college students (1929)
- An experiment in school music making (1942)
