= Christine Kenney =

New Zealand sociologist

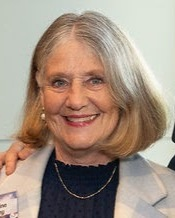
- Kenney in 2024

Academic background
- Education: Massey University
- Thesis: Me aro ki te ha o hineahuone: women, miscarriage stories, and midwifery: towards a contextually relevant research methodology (2009)
- Doctoral advisor: Cheryl Benn, Suzanne Phibbs, Taiarahia Black

Christine M. Kenney is a New Zealand sociologist, and is a Distinguished Professor of Disaster Risk Reduction at Massey University. She is the first Māori woman to lead a UN international science caucus. In 2024 Kenney was elected to the Council of the Royal Society Te Apārangi.

== Academic career ==
Kenney affiliates to Te Āti Awa, Ngāti Mutunga, Ngāti Toarangatira, and Ngāi Tahu iwi. Kenney completed a PhD titled Me aro ki te ha o hineahuone: women, miscarriage stories, and midwifery: towards a contextually relevant research methodology at Massey University in 2009. Her research was supervised by Cheryl Benn, Suzanne Phibbs and Taiarahia Black. Kenney then joined the Faculty of Medicine at the University of Alberta, followed by a stint at Edith Cowan University and joined the Faculty of Humanities and Social Sciences, School of Psychology at Massey University in 2013. Kenney became a full professor in 2022, when she was appointed the university's inaugural Professor of Disaster Risk Reduction. She is the Director of Te Toi Whakaruruhau o Aotearoa, the EQC Mātauranga Māori Disaster Risk Reduction Research Centre, a role she was appointed to at the centre's launch in 2021. In July 2024 Kenney was one of two Massey professors newly appointed as Distinguished Professors, with the citation acknowledging her "exceptional work in indigenous disaster risk reduction created a new research field".

In 2021 Kenney was invited to lead the United Nations international Indigenous Disaster Science caucus. Her appointment was requested by the International Science Council and 'key United Nations agencies'. She is the first Māori woman to lead an international science caucus at the UN. She works with the Whorld Health Organisation, and several United Nations agencies, including UNDRR, UNESCO and UNOCHA.

Kenney’s research focuses on disaster risk reduction, climate change, community resilience and humanitarian issues. Kenney was an associate investigator on a 2016 Marsden grant led by Professor Steve Matthewman at the University of Auckland, titled Power Politics: Electricity and Sustainability in Post-Disaster Ōtautahi (Christchurch). She was the sole investigator on a 2017 grant Māori, Catastrophic Events, and Collective Development of Culture-based Disaster Management Theory and Practice. In 2022, she was one of three principal investigators on the Marsden grant Kia whakatōmuri te haere whakamua: Translating Mātauranga Māori, usefully applied in the past, to enhance recovery trajectories in the future, alongside Suzanne Phibbs and Professor Te Kani Kingi of Te Whare Wānanga o Awanuiārangi.

In July 2024 Kenney was elected by the Māori Electoral College to serve on the Council of the Royal Society Te Apārangi.

== Selected works ==
- Suzanne Phibbs; Kenney, Christine; Severinsen, Christina; Jon Mitchell; Hughes, Roger (2016). "Synergising Public Health Concepts with the Sendai Framework for Disaster Risk Reduction: A Conceptual Glossary". International Journal of Environmental Research and Public Health. 13 (12). doi:10.3390/ijerph13121241. PMC 5201382. PMID 27983666. Wikidata Q30379704.
- Ashleigh Rushton; Suzanne Phibbs; Kenney, Christine; Cheryl Anderson (2024). "The Interplay of Climate and Disaster in Men's Stories of the 2016 Kaikōura Earthquake in Aotearoa New Zealand 1". Sociological Inquiry. doi:10.1111/soin.12605. Wikidata Q125630514.
- Kenney, Christine; Suzanne Phibbs (2015). "A Māori love story: Community-led disaster management in response to the Ōtautahi (Christchurch) earthquakes as a framework for action". International Journal of Disaster Risk Reduction. 14: 46–55. doi:10.1016/j.ijdrr.2014.12.010. Wikidata Q125630519.
- Ashleigh Rushton; Suzanne Phibbs; Kenney, Christine; Cheryl Anderson (2021). "'She'll be right': the place of gendered emotions in disasters". Gender. 29 (6): 793–815. doi:10.1080/0966369x.2021.1892595. Wikidata Q125630515.
- Suzanne Phibbs; Kenney, Christine (2017). "Heartaches over housing: correlating cardiovascular disease rates and housing damage in the aftermath of the Canterbury earthquakes". Lancet Planetary Health. 1 (6): e214–e215. doi:10.1016/s2542-5196(17)30096-7. PMID 29851603. Wikidata Q57095353.
- T. D. Gibson; M. Pelling; A. Ghosh; D. Matyas; A. Siddiqi; W. Solecki; L. Johnson; Kenney, Christine; D. Johnston; du Plessis, Rosemary Ann (2016). "Pathways for Transformation: Disaster Risk Management to Enhance Resilience to Extreme Events". Journal of Extreme Events. 03 (01): 1671002. doi:10.1142/s2345737616710020. Wikidata Q125630517.
