= Roka Paora =

Māori language expert

- Born: 15 February 1925; Raukokore
- Died: 15 January 2011; Ōpōtiki
- Occupations: Teacher, university teacher, writer, composer, translator
- Awards: Queen's Service Medal; Te Pihopatanga o Aotearoa Distinguished Service Medal; honorary doctor of the University of Waikato (2010)

Roka Pahewa Paora, née Swinton, QSM (15 February 1925 – 15 January 2011) was a pioneer of the Māori language, developing materials to teach the language within a whakapapa framework.

== Early life ==
Paora was born on 15 February 1925 in Raukōkore in the Bay of Plenty. She was educated at Raukōkore Primary School, Te Kaha Primary School, and Hukarere Māori Girls' College before training as a teacher at Auckland Teachers' Training College.

== Work ==
From 1946 to 1960, Paora was a primary school teacher in Te Kaha. In 1960, she began to teach te reo at Te Kaha District High School, and then held the position of First Assistant at Te Whanau-a-Apanui Area School from 1970 to 1980. From 1980 to 1986 she was an itinerant teacher of Māori in the Apanui District, after which she lectured in te reo at the Whare Wānanga o Awanuiarangi at Te Kaha. Paora was also a lecturer for the Diploma in Primary Teaching at the Auckland College of Education Outpost in Te Whanau-a-Apanui.

Paora published a series called Learning Māori with Parehau and Sharon, a classroom resource called Kia Ora. Paora was co-editor of the revised seventh edition of the HW Williams Dictionary of the Māori Language, and also Hori Ngata's English-Māori Dictionary.

As an authority on Māori language, culture and history, Paora was an advisor to the Ministry of Justice and the National Kōhanga Reo Trust.

=== Translation work ===
Paora worked as a translator for the Waka Huia series by TVNZ, school resources for the University of Otago, NZQA and the Ministry of Education, and records of the Māori Land Court relating to the history and whakapapa of Te Whanau-a-Apanui. Paora also translated a number of Disney stories into Māori, including Aladdin and Lilo and Stitch.

Her work was the subject of a doctoral thesis by her granddaughter Parehau Richards in 2016.

Paora died on 15 January 2011 at the Thornton Park Retirement Lodge in Ōpōtiki, and was interred at Wharekura Cemetery after lying at Te Kaha Marae.

== Recognition ==
Paora was awarded a Te Pihopatanga o Aotearoa Distinguished Service Medal by Te Hahi Mihinare (the Māori Anglican Church), and a Queen's Service Medal in 1983 for public service. She was awarded an honorary doctorate by the University of Waikato in 2010.

In 2017, Paora was selected by the Royal Society Te Apārangi as one of their "150 women in 150 words", celebrating the contributions of women to knowledge in New Zealand.
