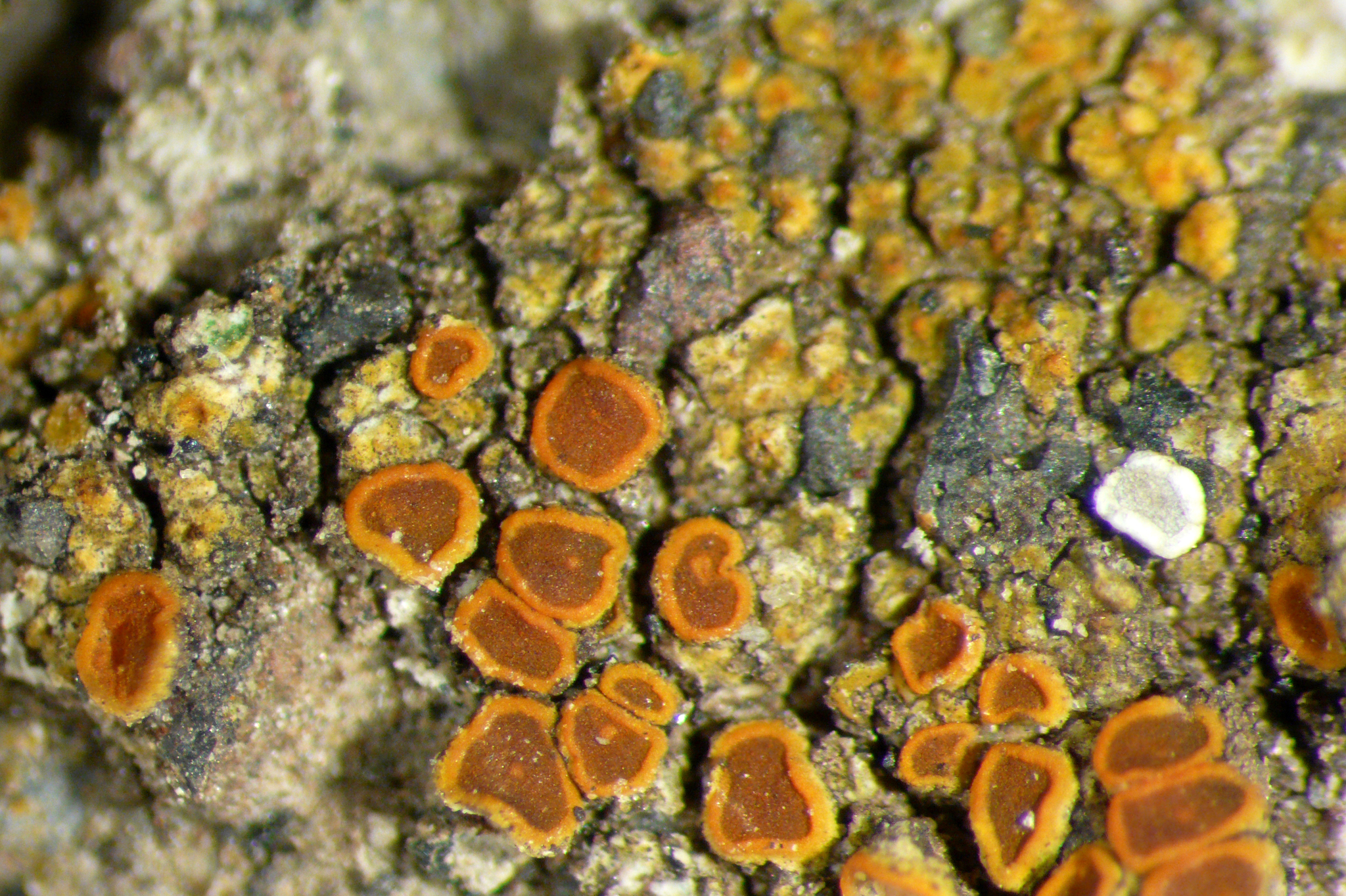

Scientific classification
- Kingdom: Fungi
- Division: Ascomycota
- Class: Lecanoromycetes
- Order: Teloschistales
- Family: Teloschistaceae
- Genus: Caloplaca
- Species: C. allanii

Binomial name
- Caloplaca allanii Zahlbr. (1934)

= Caloplaca allanii =

Species of lichen

Caloplaca allanii is a species of saxicolous (rock-dwelling) and crustose lichen in the family Teloschistaceae. Found in New Zealand, it was formally described as a new species by Alexander Zahlbruckner. The type specimen was collected by Lucy Cranwell on Anawhata Beach (Waitākere Ranges, West Auckland) in 1932; she sent a dried specimen to Zahlbruckner for identification. The specific epithet allanii honours New Zealand botanist Harry Allan.

For decades, Caloplaca allanii was a poorly known species, known only from the type collection, and it was assessed as data deficient in a 2012 conservation assessment of New Zealand lichens. In 2014, it was reported to have been rediscovered, and the range of the species was expanded. Caloplaca allanii is endemic to the Waitakere Ranges coastline west of Auckland, and has been recorded from Bethells Beach south to northern Manukau Heads. The lichen contains several secondary chemicals, including emodin, erythroglaucin, fallacinal, parietin, teloschistin, and xanthorin.

== See also ==
- List of Caloplaca species
