= William Brinsley =

New Zealand cricketer

William Brinsley MBE
Personal information
- Full name: William Richard Brinsley
- Born: 9 March 1887; Dunedin, New Zealand
- Died: 21 January 1959 (aged 71); Dunedin, New Zealand

Domestic team information
- Years: Team
- 1917/18: Otago

Career statistics
Competition	First-class
Matches	2
Runs scored	10
Batting average	3.33
100s/50s	0/0
Top score	10
Catches/stumpings	1/0
- Source: ESPNcricinfo, 16 October 2021

William Richard Brinsley MBE (9 March 1887 – 21 January 1959) was a New Zealand cricketer, manufacturer and sports administrator. He played two first-class matches for Otago in 1917/18.

Brinsley attended Otago Boys' High School in Dunedin, and in August 1925 he was one of the founders and the first captain of the Old Boys Cricket Club in Dunedin senior cricket. He was a prominent sports administrator in Dunedin. Among the offices he held, he was president of the Otago Cricket Association, president of the Otago Lawn Tennis Association, and president of the Dunedin Badminton Club. He was appointed a Member of the Order of the British Empire in the 1957 Queen's Birthday Honours, for services to the community in the field of sport.

Brinsley was the managing director of Radiation (N.Z.) Ltd, manufacturers of coal and gas cooking ranges.
