= Raukokore River =

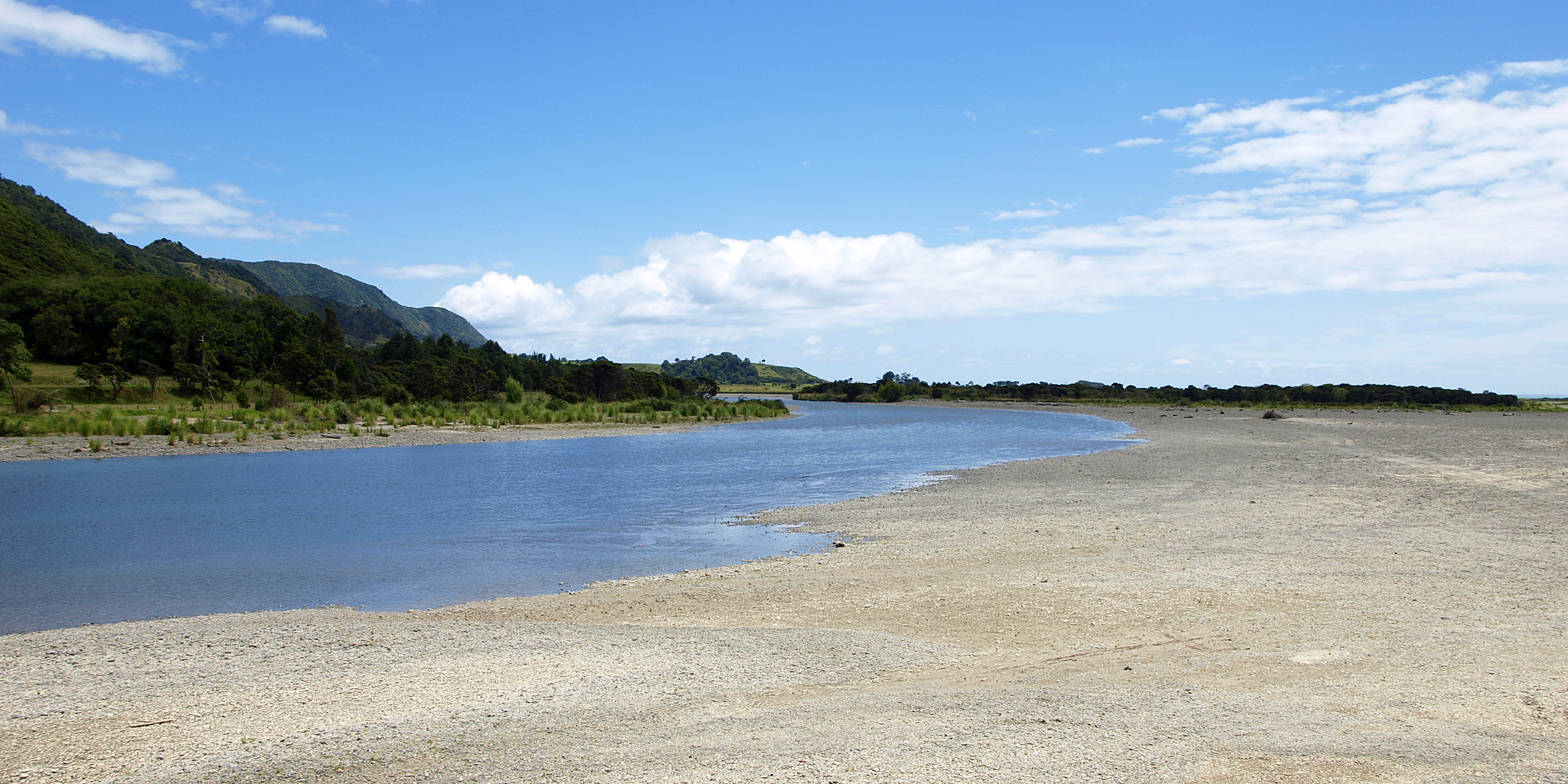
- The mouth of the Raukokore River
- Route of the Raukokore River
- Mouth of the Raukokore River Raukokore River (North Island)

Location
- Country: New Zealand

Physical characteristics
- Source: Raukūmara Range
  - coordinates: 37°45′41″S 178°06′13″E
- Mouth
  - location: Papatea Bay
  - coordinates: 37°43′59″S 177°58′41″E

Basin features
- Progression: Raukokore River → Papatea Bay → Bay of Plenty → Pacific Ocean
- Tributaries
  - left: Waireparepa Stream, Tangitarau Stream, Pohakikiwa Stream, Pohueroro Stream, Mangaikakorea Stream, Mangahatoto Stream
  - right: Okapua Stream, Mangahaupapa Stream, Waikura River, Kopungawha Stream, Makaririhau Stream, Waitarata Stream

The Raukokore River is a river in the northeast of New Zealand's North Island. it flows north from the slopes of the Raukūmara Range, reaching the sea at Papatea Bay close to the small settlement of Raukokore.
