= Albert Oliphant Stewart =

New Zealand Māori tribal leader

Albert Oliphant Stewart (16 July 1884 – 3 April 1958) was a notable New Zealand tribal leader, law clerk, interpreter, local politician, rate collector. Of Māori descent, he identified with the Ngāti Awa and Te Whānau-ā-Apanui iwi. He was born in Whakatāne, Bay of Plenty, New Zealand in 1884. He was a member of the Whakatāne Borough Council (1917–1919) and the Whakatane Harbour Board (1923–1931).
