= Sholto Kairakau Black =

Sholto Kairakau Black (13 January 1902 – 23 February 1963) was a New Zealand teacher, principal, community services co-ordinator, community leader. Of Māori descent, he identified with the Te Whānau-ā-Apanui iwi. He was born in Ōpōtiki, Bay of Plenty, New Zealand on 13 January 1902.
