= 1957 Birthday Honours (New Zealand) =

Award list for New Zealand

The 1957 Queen's Birthday Honours in New Zealand, celebrating the official birthday of Elizabeth II, were appointments made by the Queen on the advice of the New Zealand government to various orders and honours to reward and highlight good works by New Zealanders. They were announced on 13 June 1957.

The recipients of honours are displayed here as they were styled before their new honour.

== Order of Saint Michael and Saint George ==
=== Knight Commander (KCMG) ===
- The Honourable William Sullivan – lately Minister of Labour, Mines and Housing.
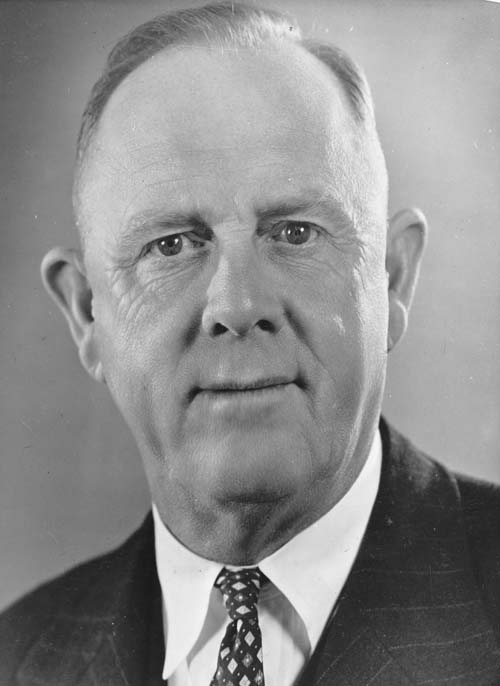
Sir William Sullivan

=== Companion (CMG) ===
- The Most Reverend Alfred Walter Averill – a former archbishop of New Zealand. For services to the community as bishop and archbishop.
- Gordon Graham Gibbes Watson QC – of Lower Hutt. For services to the legal profession.

== Order of the British Empire ==
=== Commander (CBE) ===
Civil division

- Percy William Burbidge – professor of physics, Auckland University College, 1921–1957.
- Alfred Hyde Cockayne ISO – of Wellington. For services to agriculture.
- William Gordon Victor Fernie – of Christchurch. For services to commerce and industry.

Military division

- Brigadier Leonard Whitmore Thornton OBE – Colonels' List, New Zealand Regular Force.
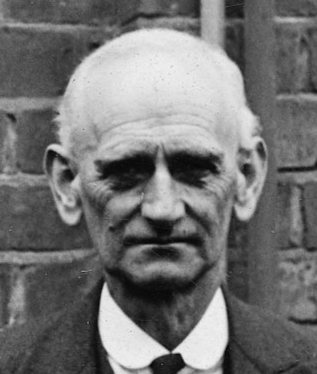
Alfred Cockayne

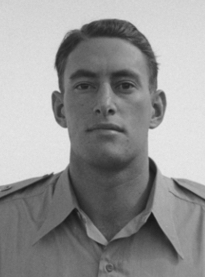
Leonard Thornton

=== Officer (OBE) ===
Civil division

- Karauria Tiweka Anaru – of Rotorua. For services to the Māori people.
- Archibald Turner McLeod Blair MB ChB – a medical practitioner at the Queen Elizabeth Hospital, Rotorua.
- John Richard Hertslet Fulton MB ChB – chairman of the Otago Hospital Board, Dunedin.
- Thomas Vernon Griffiths – professor of music at the University of New Zealand, and Dean of the Faculty, Canterbury University College.
- Laurence David Hickford – of Ōkato. For services to agriculture and local government.
- Frederick George Hall-Jones – of Invercargill. For services in community affairs and as historian in Southland.
- John Mark MB ChB – a medical practitioner and surgeon at Tauranga.
- Henry Cochrane McCoy – chairman of the Board of Trustees of the New Zealand Institute for the Blind.
- William Glendinning Rodger – of Wellington. For services to accountancy and the secretarial profession.
- Captain David Martin Todd – of the Mercantile Marine Service; harbourmaster at Wellington.
- Charles Robert Wilson DCM – of Wellington. For services to ex-servicemen.
- Catherine Mary Josephine Wylie – matron of the mental hospital, Seacliff.

Military division

- Acting Commander Edward Perry Reade DSC – Royal Navy (lately on loan to the Royal New Zealand Navy).
- Lieutenant-Colonel Tom Bassett Morten DSO ED – Royal New Zealand Infantry (Territorial Force).
- Wing Commander John William Todd MBE – Royal New Zealand Air Force.
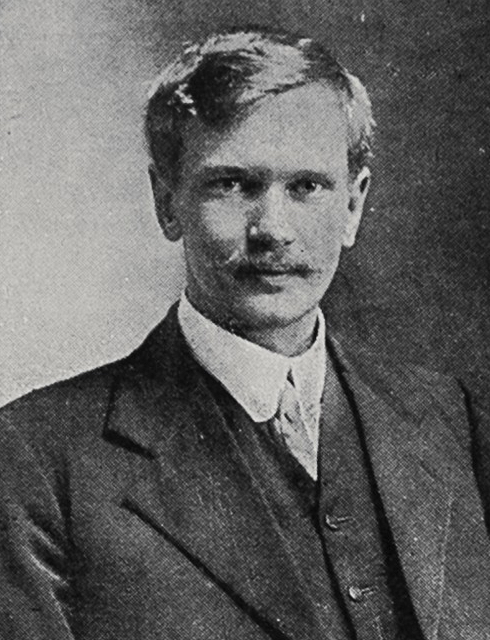
Fred Hall-Jones

=== Member (MBE) ===
Civil division

- Valerie Patricia Louise Anquetil – chief officer for nursing cadets, St John Ambulance Brigade.
- Frederick Robert Ball – of Gisborne. For services to the community in local-body work.
- Reginald Malcolm Barker – honorary secretary of the Auckland branch of the Heritage Movement.
- William Richard Brinsley Sr – of Dunedin. For services to the community in the field of sport.
- Arthur Martineau Burrows – secretary of the Eltham Volunteer Fire Brigade.
- Bernard James Cooke – of Blenheim. For services to local government.
- Ethel Mildred Cordner – of Christchurch. For social welfare services.
- Christina Dufton Elliott – of Dunedin. For services rendered under the auspices of various women's organisations.
- Phyllis Jean Fletcher. For services in the education of intellectually handicapped children at the Christchurch Occupation Centre.
- Horace Victor Haywood – superintendent of the Mount Eden Prison, Auckland.
- Lucy Hughes – of Auckland. For social welfare services.
- William Leslie Hughes JP – lately mayor of Dargaville.
- John Charles Derbie Mackley – county clerk of the Masterton County Council.
- Alice Kathleen Maclean – of Wanganui. For public and social welfare services.
- John McCarthy – mayor of Waipukurau.
- Ada Evelyn Morrison – matron of the Glenelg Health Camp, Christchurch.
- Oma Taka Moss – of Christchurch. For social welfare services on behalf of Māori women.
- Norman Leslie Shaw – housemaster, France House, Eskdale. For services to the community.
- George Stratton JP – of Dunedin. For services to the community in local-body work.
- Rosemary Trafford – sister-in-charge of the maternity annex, Nelson Public Hospital.
- Lilian Ana Mary Wyatt – of Christchurch. For services rendered under the auspices of various patriotic and other organisations.

Military division

- Lieutenant-Commander John Fergus Young Schischka VRD – Royal New Zealand Naval Volunteer Reserve.
- Major Douglas Gordon Warner Green – Royal New Zealand Artillery (Territorial Force).
- Captain Elsie Phyllis Hogan – New Zealand Women's Royal Army Corps (Regular Force).
- Major Albert Edward Melville Lawrence – Royal New Zealand Armoured Corps (Regular Force).
- Warrant Officer Class II Oswald Albert Wahrlich – Royal New Zealand Artillery (Regular Force).
- Squadron Leader Colin Campbell Charles Manson – Royal New Zealand Air Force.
- Flight Lieutenant Allan John Charles Clark – Royal New Zealand Air Force.

== Companion of the Imperial Service Order (ISO) ==
- Wilfred Evelyn Hodges – chairman of the Government Railways Commission.
- Frederick George Oborn – lately commissioner of Inland Revenue.

== British Empire Medal (BEM) ==
Civil division

- David Clarke Muir – constable, New Zealand Police Force, Kawakawa.
- Robert Methven Peggie – constable, New Zealand Police Force, Roxburgh.
- Archibald Herbert Victor Waters – instructor, Prisons Service, Wellington.

Military division

- Chief Petty Officer Wren Barbara Radford Bilton – Women's Royal New Zealand Naval Service.
- Chief Electrician John Charles Harris – Royal New Zealand Navy.
- Engine Room Artificer 1st Class Ernest Alexander Newman – Royal New Zealand Navy.
- Sick Berth Chief Petty Officer Walter Roy Robb – Royal New Zealand Navy.
- Sergeant Peter Percival Clarke Cooper – New Zealand Regiment (Regular Force).
- Corporal Henry Cecil Wright – Royal New Zealand Corps of Signals (Regular Force).
- Flight Sergeant John William Sharp – Royal New Zealand Air Force.
- Sergeant Edward Joseph Brown – Royal New Zealand Air Force.

== Air Force Cross (AFC) ==
- Squadron Leader Ronald Arthur Manners MBE – Royal New Zealand Air Force.
- Flight Lieutenant Ronald Charles MacFarlane – Royal New Zealand Air Force.

== Queen's Commendation for Valuable Service in the Air ==
- Flight Lieutenant John Edward Wood DFC – Royal New Zealand Air Force.
