= Mihi Kōtukutuku Stirling =

New Zealand Māori tribal leader (1870–1956)

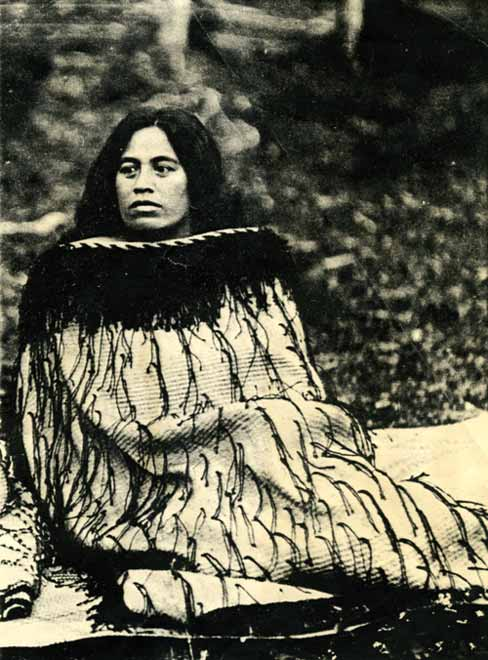
- Mihi Kōtukutuku Stirling
- Born: Mihi Kōtukutuku; 30 October 1870; Pohaturoa, Bay of Plenty Region
- Died: 14 November 1956 (aged 86); Raukokore, Bay of Plenty Region
- Spouse(s): Duncan Stirling, architect
- Parent(s): Maaka te Ehutu, Ruiha Rahuta

Mihi Kōtukutuku Stirling (1870–1956) was a New Zealand Māori tribal leader and prominent landowner in the Raukokore district. She was a member of the Ngāti Porou and Te Whānau-ā-Apanui iwi.

== Life ==
Mihi Kōtukutuku was born in Pohaturoa, Bay of Plenty, New Zealand in 1870. Her parents were each of the senior line in their respective hapū; Mihi was their third daughter, but her eldest sister had drowned before Mihi was born, and her second sister died young. Their deaths were attributed to mākutu (witchcraft) motivated by disapproval of having women destined for chiefly office.

To avert the curse, Mihi was advised not to marry a local man. Accordingly, in 1896 she married architect Duncan Stirling, originally from Riverton, in the church he had built in Raukokore. The couple had ten children and lived in a large house that Duncan built, locally known as "Stirling Castle".

The Stirlings took up farming in addition to Duncan Stirling's building business. Stirling was an expert in growing exceptionally large kūmara by traditional methods, which she supplied to all major local hui. When the Native Land Court investigated local land titles in 1919, Stirling was awarded much of the district on the strength of her father's successful claim in the previous century. Stirling generously included several other local families in the titles, and was a successful land investor, leveraging her shares in the Tawaroa land block to set up the dairy farming industry in the region.

As chief, Stirling took an active role in preserving tikanga Māori. She was one of the few women of her generation in the district who had the right to speak on marae. This right was from time to time challenged by male leaders, most famously the Te Arawa chief Mita Taupopoki, who told her to get off "his" marae. She stood her ground and when he had finished his objections she defended her position. She recited her whakapapa, showing that she was descended from a lineage senior to his. She was not on his marae, she was on her marae. She insulted him by exposing her genitals, telling the chief that that was where he came from. Those assembled were asked to gainsay her speech but no one came forward. Exposing your genitals is a Maori gesture known as whakapohane and this countered the insult that was aimed at her.

Stirling was a lifelong supporter of Sir Āpirana Ngata. She funded his land investments in the name of Te Whānau-ā-Apanui and was involved, along with her husband and their second son Eruera, in his campaigns for Parliament. Unlike some of his other supporters, she remained loyal when he resigned from Parliament in disgrace over misappropriation of funds in the Department of Native Affairs. When he died she led the laments at his tangihanga.

In recognition for her community service, Stirling was awarded a medal and certificate from Buckingham Palace in 1911 on the occasion of the coronation of King George V, and in 1953 she was presented to Queen Elizabeth II during the royal visit to Rotorua. She died of breast cancer at the age of 87 and was survived by Duncan Stirling, who was then 90.
