= Monita Delamere =

Sir Monita Eru Delamere KBE JP (17 June 1921 – 28 April 1993) was a New Zealand rugby player, dry-cleaner, Ringatu leader, community leader. Of Māori descent, he identified with the Ngāi Tahu and Te Whānau-ā-Apanui iwi. He was born in Omaio, Bay of Plenty, New Zealand, on 17 June 1921. His father was Paora Kingi Delamere.

In the 1990 New Year Honours, Delamere was appointed a Knight Commander of the Order of the British Empire, for services to the Māori people. Also in 1990, he was awarded the New Zealand 1990 Commemoration Medal.
