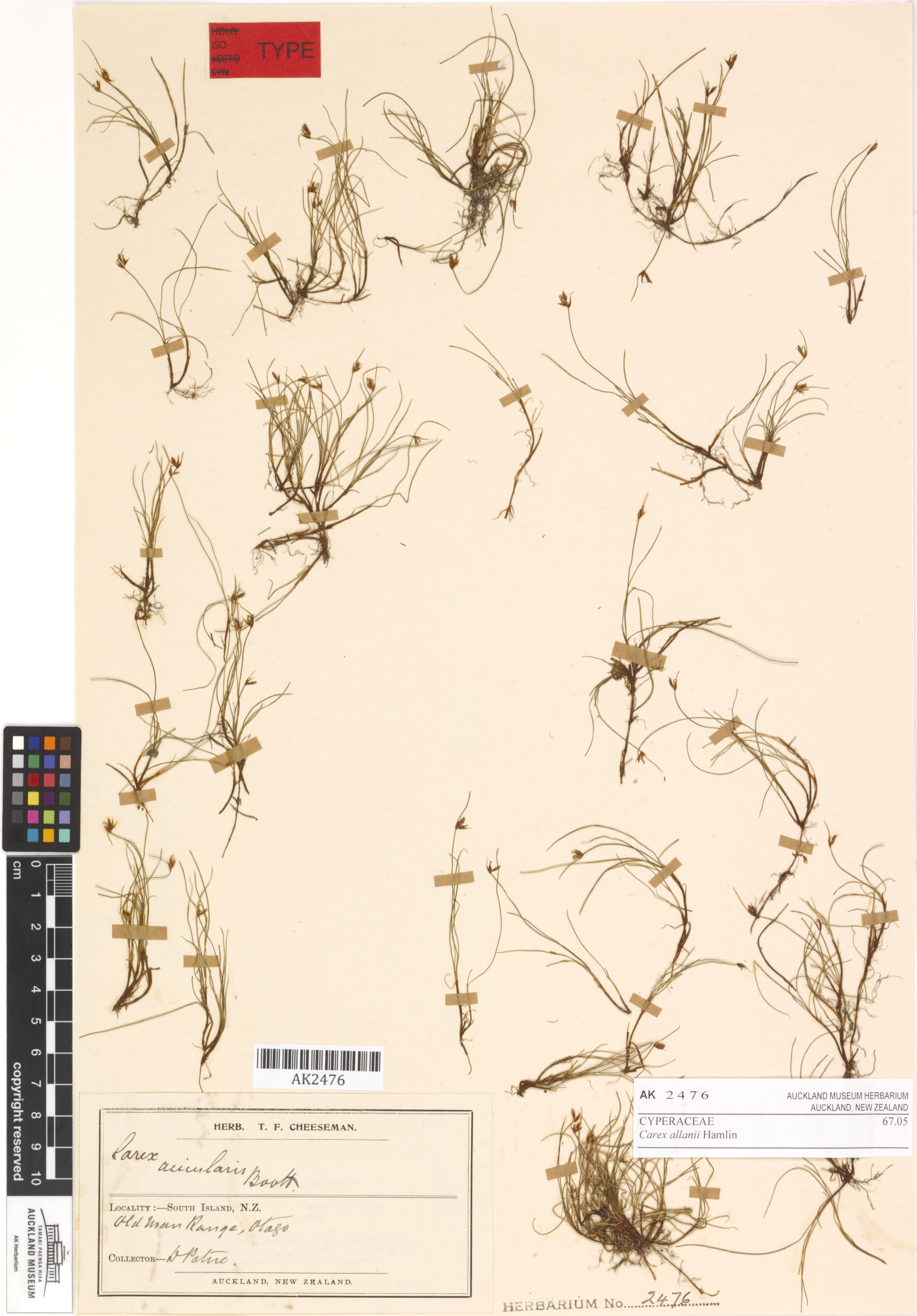
- Carex allanii

Scientific classification
- Kingdom: Plantae
- Clade: Tracheophytes
- Clade: Angiosperms
- Clade: Monocots
- Clade: Commelinids
- Order: Poales
- Family: Cyperaceae
- Genus: Carex
- Species: C. allanii

Binomial name
- Carex allanii Hamlin

= Carex allanii =

Species of grass-like plant

Carex allanii, commonly known as Allan's sedge, is a sedge that is found in the South Island of New Zealand.

== See also ==
- List of Carex species
