= Raukokore =

Settlement in Bay of Plenty, New Zealand

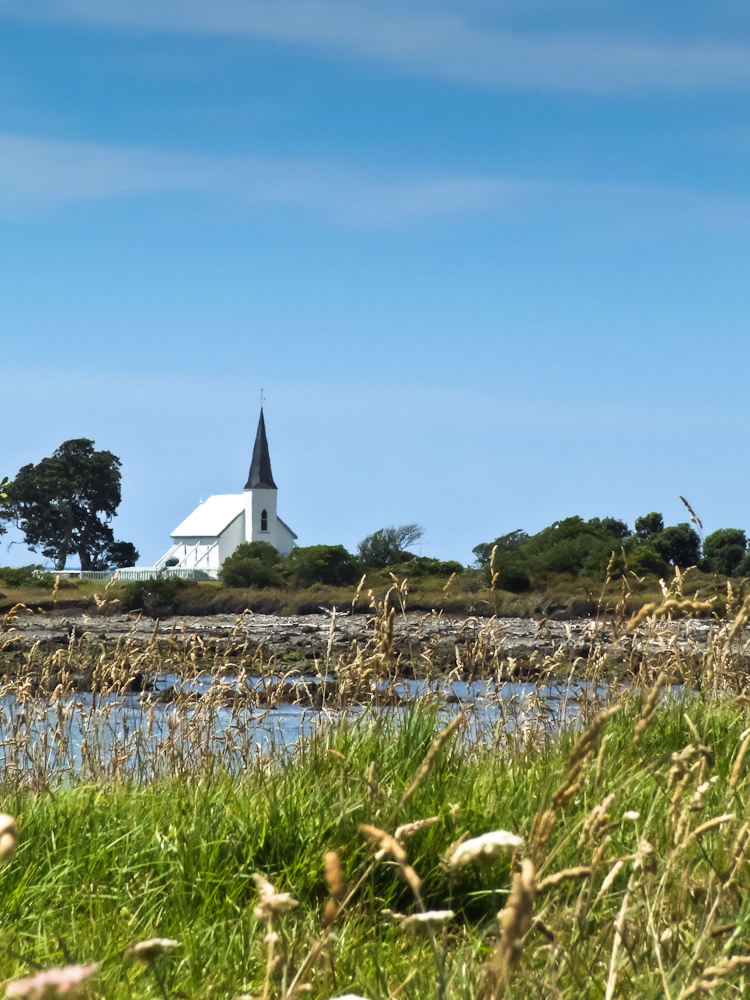
- Raukokore's Anglican church
- Interactive map of Raukokore
- Coordinates: 37°38′38″S 177°52′35″E
- Country: New Zealand
- Region: Bay of Plenty
- Territorial authority: Ōpōtiki District
- Ward: Coast Ward
- Community: Coast Community
- Electorates: East Cape; Waiariki (Māori)

Government
  - Territorial authority: Ōpōtiki District Council
  - Regional council: Bay of Plenty Regional Council
  - Mayor of Ōpōtiki: David Moore
  - East Cape MP: Dana Kirkpatrick
  - Waiariki MP: Rawiri Waititi

Area
  - Total: 100.96 km^{2} (38.98 sq mi)

Population (2023 Census)
  - Total: 345
  - Density: 3.42/km^{2} (8.85/sq mi)

Raukokore is a small settlement close to the East Cape in the northeastern North Island of New Zealand. It is located on State Highway 35, close to the mouth of the Raukokore River, 40 kilometres to the west of Hicks Bay.

Raukokore's most notable feature is its Anglican church, Christ Church, a landmark of the East Cape region, which stands isolated close to the shore of Papatea Bay. The church was named as one of the East Cape/Gisborne region's "101 must-do" sites by the New Zealand Automobile Association. The church was designed and built by Duncan Stirling in 1894. Stirling married local Raukokore chief Mihi Kōtukutuku in the church in 1896. The church is listed as a Category 1 Historic Place by Heritage New Zealand.

Raukokore is administered by the Ōpōtiki District Council.

== Demographics ==
Raukokore and its surrounds cover 100.96 km^{2} (38.98 sq mi). Raukokore is part of the larger Cape Runaway statistical area.

Historical population
| Year | Pop. | ±% p.a. |
|---|---|---|
| 2006 | 150 | — |
| 2013 | 258 | +8.06% |
| 2018 | 216 | −3.49% |
| 2023 | 345 | +9.82% |
The 2006 population is for a smaller area of 34.43 km^{2}. Source:

Raukokore and its surrounds had a population of 345 in the 2023 New Zealand census, an increase of 129 people (59.7%) since the 2018 census, and an increase of 87 people (33.7%) since the 2013 census. There were 177 males and 165 females in 123 dwellings. 0.9% of people identified as LGBTIQ+. The median age was 44.5 years (compared with 38.1 years nationally). There were 84 people (24.3%) aged under 15 years, 42 (12.2%) aged 15 to 29, 150 (43.5%) aged 30 to 64, and 66 (19.1%) aged 65 or older.

People could identify as more than one ethnicity. The results were 35.7% European (Pākehā), 84.3% Māori, 2.6% Pasifika, 0.9% Asian, and 1.7% other, which includes people giving their ethnicity as "New Zealander". English was spoken by 93.9%, Māori by 45.2%, and other languages by 0.9%. No language could be spoken by 3.5% (e.g. too young to talk). The percentage of people born overseas was 2.6, compared with 28.8% nationally.

Religious affiliations were 27.8% Christian, and 15.7% Māori religious beliefs. People who answered that they had no religion were 45.2%, and 12.2% of people did not answer the census question.

Of those at least 15 years old, 24 (9.2%) people had a bachelor's or higher degree, 156 (59.8%) had a post-high school certificate or diploma, and 78 (29.9%) people exclusively held high school qualifications. The median income was $26,100, compared with $41,500 nationally. 9 people (3.4%) earned over $100,000 compared to 12.1% nationally. The employment status of those at least 15 was 99 (37.9%) full-time, 33 (12.6%) part-time, and 21 (8.0%) unemployed.

== Marae ==
The settlement is in the rohe of the iwi of Te Whānau-ā-Apanui and has two marae affiliated with local hapū.

- Te Maru o Hinemaka Marae and Pararaki meeting house is affiliated with Te Whānau a Pararaki.
- Wairūrū Marae and Hinemahuru or Mihi Kōtukutuko meeting house is affiliated with Te Whānau a Maruhaeremuri.

In October 2020, the Government committed $205,700 from the Provincial Growth Fund to develop Wairūrū Marae, creating 8 jobs.

== Education ==
Raukōkore School opened in 1887 and was amalgamated with Whānau-ā-Apanui Area School and Te Kura o Ōmaio to Te Kura o Te Whānau-a-Apanui at Te Kaha in 2015.

== Notable people ==
- Taika Waititi – Academy Award-winning filmmaker, screenwriter and actor
- Rawiri Waititi – New Zealand politician, iwi leader, Ringatū minister and kapa haka exponent
- Tweedie Waititi – New Zealand film director and producer
