= Taiarahia Black =

New Zealand academic

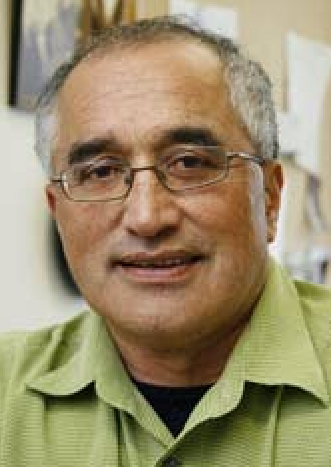
- Black in 2007
- Education: Massey University
- Relatives: Otere Black (son)
- Scientific career
- Workplaces: Massey University
- Thesis: Kāore te aroha-- : te hua o te wānanga (2000)

Taiarahia Black is a New Zealand academic, who rose to a full professor at the Massey University.

== Academic career ==
After completing an undergraduate degree at the University of Waikato, he moved to Massey in 1981. His PhD 'Kāore te aroha-- : te hua o te wānanga' , completed at Massey University in 2000, was the first PhD thesis at any university to be published in te reo Māori. Black later became a professor at Te Whare Wānanga o Awanuiārangi in Whakatāne.

Black was appointed to the council of Creative New Zealand by Maggie Barry, Minister for Arts, Culture and Heritage.

== Selected works ==
- Pardo, Natalia, Hildalene Wilson, Jonathan N. Procter, Erica Lattughi, and Taiarahia Black. "Bridging Māori indigenous knowledge and western geosciences to reduce social vulnerability in active volcanic regions." Journal of Applied Volcanology 4, no. 1 (2015): 5.
- Christensen, Ian S., Taiarahia E. Black, Arohia E. Durie, Mason H. Durie, Eljon D. Fitzgerald, and Julia T. Taiapa. "Maori Language in the Manawatu Whanganui Region: Analysis and Discussion of Preliminary Findings From the Te Hoe Nuku Roa Household Survey." He Pukenga Korero 2, no. 2 (2013).
- McKinley, Sheridan A., Taiarahia E. Black, Ian S. Christensen, and Pare Richardson. "Toi te Kupu: Maori Language Resource Materials." He Pukenga Korero 3, no. 1 (2013).

== Personal life ==
Black is Māori, of Ngāi Tūhoe, Te Whānau a Apanui, Te Arawa, Ngāti Tūwharetoa and Ngāi Te Rangi descent. Black's son Otere Black plays rugby professionally.
