= Pāora Taki =

New Zealand tribal leader and warrior

Pāora Taki (?–1897) was a notable New Zealand tribal leader and warrior. Of Māori descent, he identified with the Ngāi Tahu iwi.
