= Te Whānau-ā-Apanui =

Māori iwi (tribe) in Aotearoa (New Zealand)

- Iwi (tribe) in Māoridom
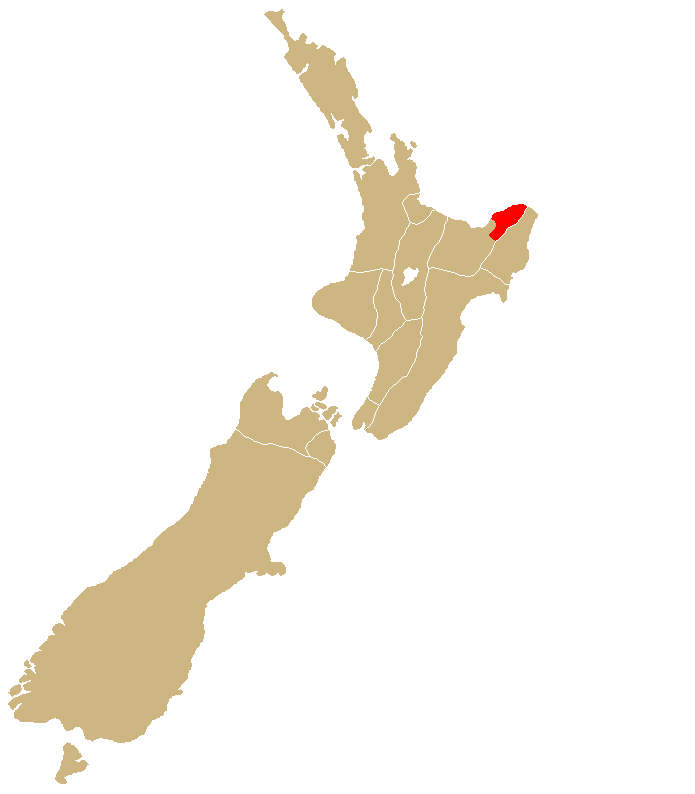
- Rohe (region): Eastern North Island
- Waka (canoe): Tauira-mai-Tawhiti, Mātaatua, Arawa
- Population: 11,808
- Website: www.apanui.co.nz

Te Whānau-ā-Apanui is a Māori iwi (tribe) located in the eastern Bay of Plenty and East Coast regions of New Zealand's North Island. In 2006, the iwi registered 11,808 members, representing 13 hapū.

== History ==
=== Early history ===
During the 17th century, Apanui acquired vast amounts of land along the East Coast of the North Island. Through familial connection, he acquired land from Ngāti Porou and Ngāriki. He was given land extending from Pōtikirua to Puketapu, and from Taumata-ō-Apanui Hawai; the land in between was later won through conquest.

=== Modern history ===
Relations with Europeans were not generally hostile. Early European settlers showed little interest in the isolated region, which lacked deep-water harbours for shipping. However, visiting Europeans taught Te Whānau-ā-Apanui the skills of whaling and commercial agriculture. Both areas become major economic industries for the iwi in the early 20th century, and profits were directed into community development projects.

During the 1980s, the iwi experienced economic decline with the loss of major transport services, privatization of state assets and the eventual economic unfeasibility of its small-scale farming operations. This resulted in some emigration of iwi members from traditional tribal homelands.

There are three groups that have competed at The Matatini from Te Whānau a Apanui: Te Kapa Haka o Te Whānau a Apanui (3x Champions 2005, 2015 and 2023), Tutawake and Tauira-mai-tawhiti.

== Hapū and marae ==
The iwi (tribe) consists of 13 hapū (sub-tribes).

Each is associated with a marae (communal ground) and wharenui (meeting house). Ki

- Te Whānau a Haraawaka, of Tunapahore marae and Haraawaka wharenui
- Te Whānau a Hikarukutai, of Maraenui marae and Te Iwarau wharenui
- Te Whānau a Kahurautao, of Pāhāōa and Kahurautao wharenui
- Te Whānau a Kaiaio, of Maungaroa marae and Kaiaio wharenui
- Te Whānau a Kauaetangohia, of Whangaparāōa marae and Kauaetangohia / Te Putahou wharenui
- Te Whānau a Maruhaeremuri, of Wairūrū marae and Hinemahuru / Mihi Kotukutuko wharenui
- Te Whānau a Nuku, of Ōmāio marae and Rongomaihuatahi wharenui
- Te Whānau a Pararaki, of Te Maru o Hinemaka marae and Pararaki wharenui
- Te Whānau a Rutaia, of Ōtūwhare marae and Te Poho o Rūtāia wharenui, and Rongohaere marae and Rongohaere wharenui
- Te Whānau a Tapaeururangi, of Pōtaka marae and Te Ēhutu / Te Pae o Ngā Pakanga wharenui
- Te Whānau a Te Ēhutu, of Te Kaha marae and Tūkākī wharenui
- Te Whānau a Toihau / Hiinetekahu, of Waiōrore marae and Toihau wharenui
- Te Whānau a Tutawake, of Whitianga marae and Tūtawake wharenui

== Governance ==
=== Te Rūnanga o te Whānau ===
Te Rūnanga o te Whānau represents Te Whānau a Apanui during resource consent applications under the Resource Management Act, but forwards each application on to the directly affected hapū. It is based on Te Kaha, and governed by representatives from at least ten hapū.

The charitable trust is involved in social services and local economic development. It manages a fisheries operation, and invests in the development of local forestry and other industries. Its Cyberwaka rural community project provides information technology training.

=== Negotiations team ===
The Crown has recognised Te Whānau a Apanui Negotiations Team to represent the iwi during Treaty of Waitangi settlement negotiations. The terms of the negotiation were signed with the Crown in September 2017.

=== Local government ===
The tribal area of the iwi is within the territory of the Ōpōtiki District Council.

It is also within the wider territory of Bay of Plenty Regional Council.

== Media ==
=== Sea 92FM ===
Pan-tribal iwi station Sea 92FM broadcasts to members of Te Whānau-ā-Apanui, Te Whakatōhea and Ngāitai in the Ōpōtiki area. It is operated by pan-tribal service provider Whakaatu Whanaunga Trust, and is available on 92.0 FM. It operates the low-power Opotiki 88.1 FM, geared towards a young demographic.

=== Boy (Movie) ===
In 2010, Taika Waititi directed and acted in Boy, a film based in Te Whānau-ā-Apanui.

== Notable people ==
- Mihi Kōtukutuku Stirling, tribal leader and orator
- Dr Rina Winifred Moore, first female Māori doctor
- Ākenehi Hei, Māori district nurse, midwife, first Māori to become a qualified nurse
- Fanny Howie, singer and composer
- Karauria Tiweka Anaru, New Zealand interpreter, law clerk, local politician and community leader
- Hoani Waititi, educationalist and community leader
- Archbishop Brown Turei, Bishop of Aotearoa – the Tikanga Māori Archbishop and Primate of the Anglican Church in New Zealand, Aotearoa and Polynesia.
- Roka Paora, Māori language expert, translator, author and educator
- Moana-Nui-a-Kiwa Ngarimu, first Māori recipient of the Victoria Cross for New Zealand medal, 28th Maori Battalion (C Company)
- Willie Apiata, second Māori recipient of the Victoria Cross for New Zealand medal
- Sir Monita Delamere, rugby player (Māori All Blacks), Ringatū faith leader and community leader
- Dame June Mariu (née Waititi), first Māori captain and first winning captain of the Silver Ferns, Māori community leader, educator and sportswoman
- Sir Wira Gardiner, soldier, public servant, and writer
- Cliff Whiting, artist
- Paratene Matchitt, sculptor and painter
- Roka Ngarimu-Cameron, master weaver
- Taiarahia Black, academic, professor and father of Otere Black
- George Gage, Ringatū faith leader
- Albert Oliphant Stewart, tribal leader, law clerk, interpreter, local politician, rate collector
- Rona Hurley, tobacco grower and buyer
- Anne Delamere, New Zealand public servant
- Pae Ruha, Māori leader, educator
- Witi Ihimaera, author, writer, academic
- Pāora Kīngi Delamere, Ringatū faith leader, carpenter, boat builder, farmer
- Heta Hingston, lawyer, jurist, judge of the Māori Land Court 1984–1999, and Chief Justice of Niue until 2010
- Tuariki Delamere, former politician (Minister of Immigration, Minister of Pacific Island Affairs, Associate Minister of Finance, and Associate Minister of Health)
- Claudette Hauiti, former politician, producer, Broadcaster and Journalist
- Rawiri Waititi, politician, co-leader of Te Pāti Māori
- Taika Waititi, filmmaker
- Tweedie Waititi, filmmaker
- Ainsley Gardiner, film producer
- Riwia Brown, playwright and screenwriter
- Apirana Taylor, actor, writer, playwright
- Rangimoana Taylor, actor, academic
- Whirimako Black, musician
- Rob Ruha, musician, weaver, artist
- Maisey Rika, musician
- Troy Kingi, musician
- Ria Hall, musician
- Tayi Tibble, poet
- Olivia Aroha Giles, contemporary creative specialising in art textiles, design, illustration and writing
- Kahurangi Waititi, netball player
- Kerry-Anne Tomlinson, cricket player
- Reuben Parkinson, rugby player (Japan NRU Team) and older brother of Matua Parkinson
- Matua Parkinson, rugby player (Māori All Blacks, and NZ Sevens Team), tv personality and younger brother of Reuben Parkinson
- Charlie Ngatai, rugby player Māori All Blacks
- Sandra Ioane (née Wihongi), rugby player (Black Ferns) and mother of Akira & Rieko Ioane
- Akira Ioane, rugby player (Māori All Blacks, All Blacks and NZ Sevens Team)
- Rieko Ioane, rugby player (Māori All Blacks, All Blacks and NZ Sevens Team)
- Ruahei Demant, rugby player (Black Ferns captain)
- Kiritapu Demant, rugby player (Black Ferns), barber
- Stacey Fluhler, rugby player (Black Ferns and NZ Sevens Team) and sister to Beaudein Waaka
- Beaudein Waaka, rugby player (NZ Sevens Team) and brother to Stacey Fluhler
- Natalie Delamere, rugby player (Black Ferns)
- Luka Connor, rugby player (Black Ferns)
- Pari Pari Parkinson, rugby player (Māori All Blacks)
- Otere Black, rugby player (Māori All Blacks) and son of Taiarahia Black
- Hoani Matenga, rugby player (Māori All Blacks)
- Sholto Kairakau Black, teacher and community leader

== See also ==
- List of Māori iwi
