= Alfred Cockayne =

New Zealand botanist, agricultural scientist and administrator (1880–1966)

Alfred Cockayne CBE ISO
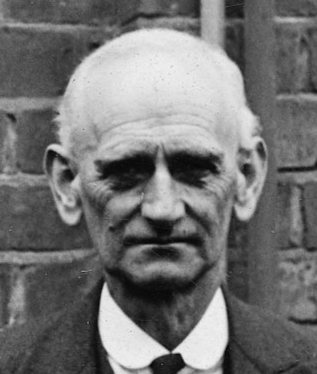
- Cockayne in 1936
- Born: 23 May 1880; Oamaru or Dunedin, New Zealand
- Died: 21 October 1966 (aged 86); Waikanae, New Zealand
- Relatives: Leonard Cockayne (father)

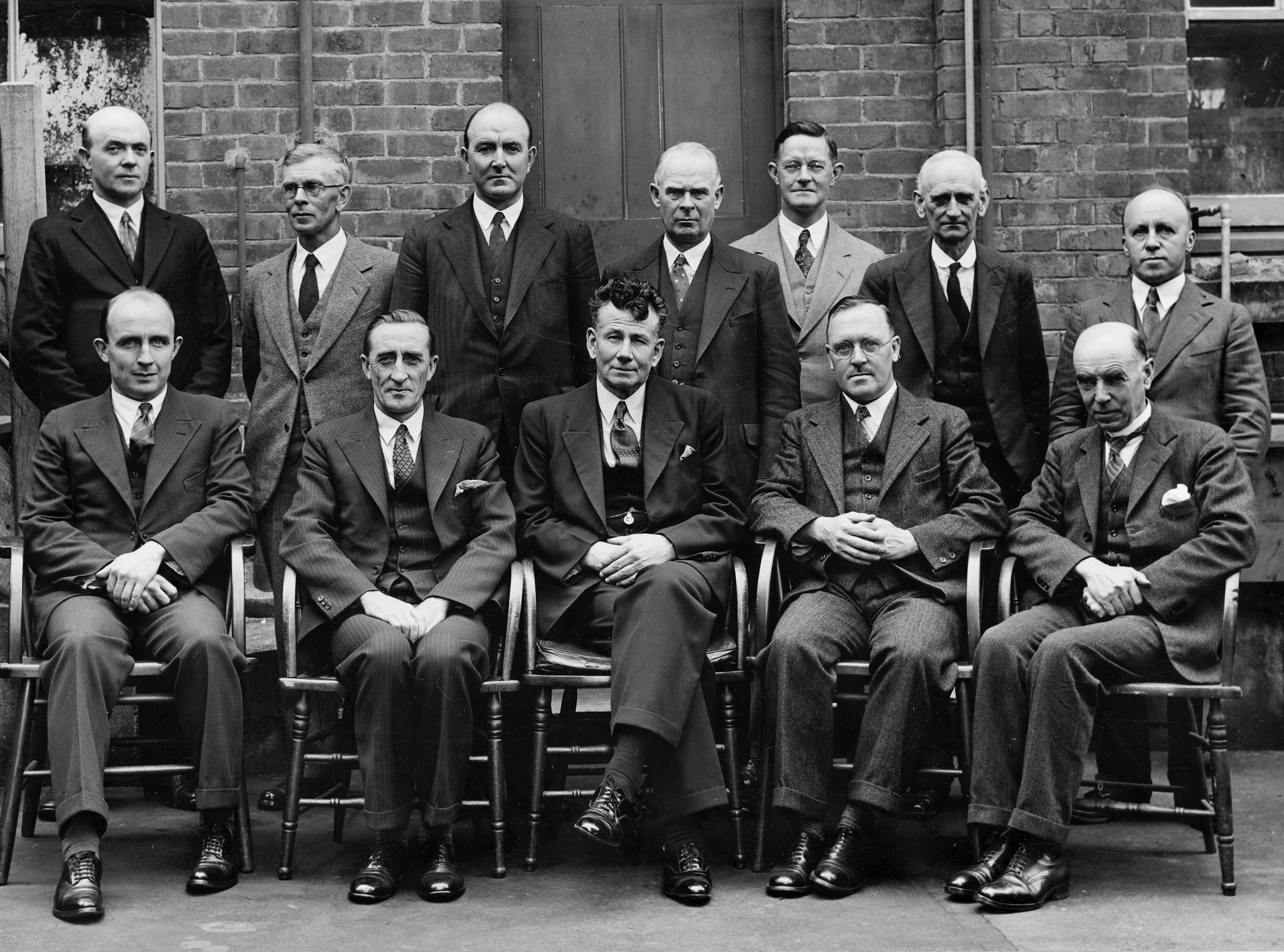
Members of the New Zealand Research Council with Cockayne standing second from the right, 1936

Alfred Hyde Cockayne CBE ISO (23 May 1880 – 21 October 1966) was a New Zealand botanist, agricultural scientist and administrator. He was born in Dunedin, or Oamaru, New Zealand, on 23 May 1880. He was the son of another noted botanist Leonard Cockayne.

== Honours ==
In the 1937 Coronation Honours, Cockayne was made a Companion of the Imperial Service Order. In the 1957 Queen's Birthday Honours, he was appointed a Commander of the Order of the British Empire, for services to agriculture.
