= Waikura River (Raukokore River tributary) =

- Route of the Waikura River
- Mouth of the Waikura River Waikura River (Raukokore River tributary) (North Island)

Location
- Country: New Zealand

Physical characteristics
- Source: Raukūmara Range
  - coordinates: 37°45′41″S 178°06′13″E
- Mouth
  - location: Raukokore River
  - coordinates: 37°43′59″S 177°58′41″E
- Length: 17 km (11 mi)

Basin features
- Progression: Waikura River → Raukokore River → Papatea Bay → Bay of Plenty → Pacific Ocean
- Tributaries
  - left: Mangamaha Stream, Mangaotāne Stream, Kate Hirere Stream
  - right: Mangahinātore Stream

The Waikura River is a river of the northern Gisborne District of New Zealand's North Island. It flows initially northwest before turning southwest to reach the Raukokore River 25 kilometres (16 mi) east of Te Kaha.

== See also ==
- List of rivers of New Zealand
