= Pāora Kīngi Delamere =

New Zealand carpenter, boat builder and Ringatū leader

Pāora Kīngi Delamere (1889 – 19 December 1981) was a New Zealand carpenter, boat builder, farmer and Ringatū leader. Of Māori descent, he identified with the Te Whakatōhea and Te Whānau-ā-Apanui iwi. He was born in Whitianga, East Cape, New Zealand on 1889. He was the father of Monita Eru Delamere.
