= Leonard Cockayne =

New Zealand botanist (1855–1934)

Leonard Cockayne FRS
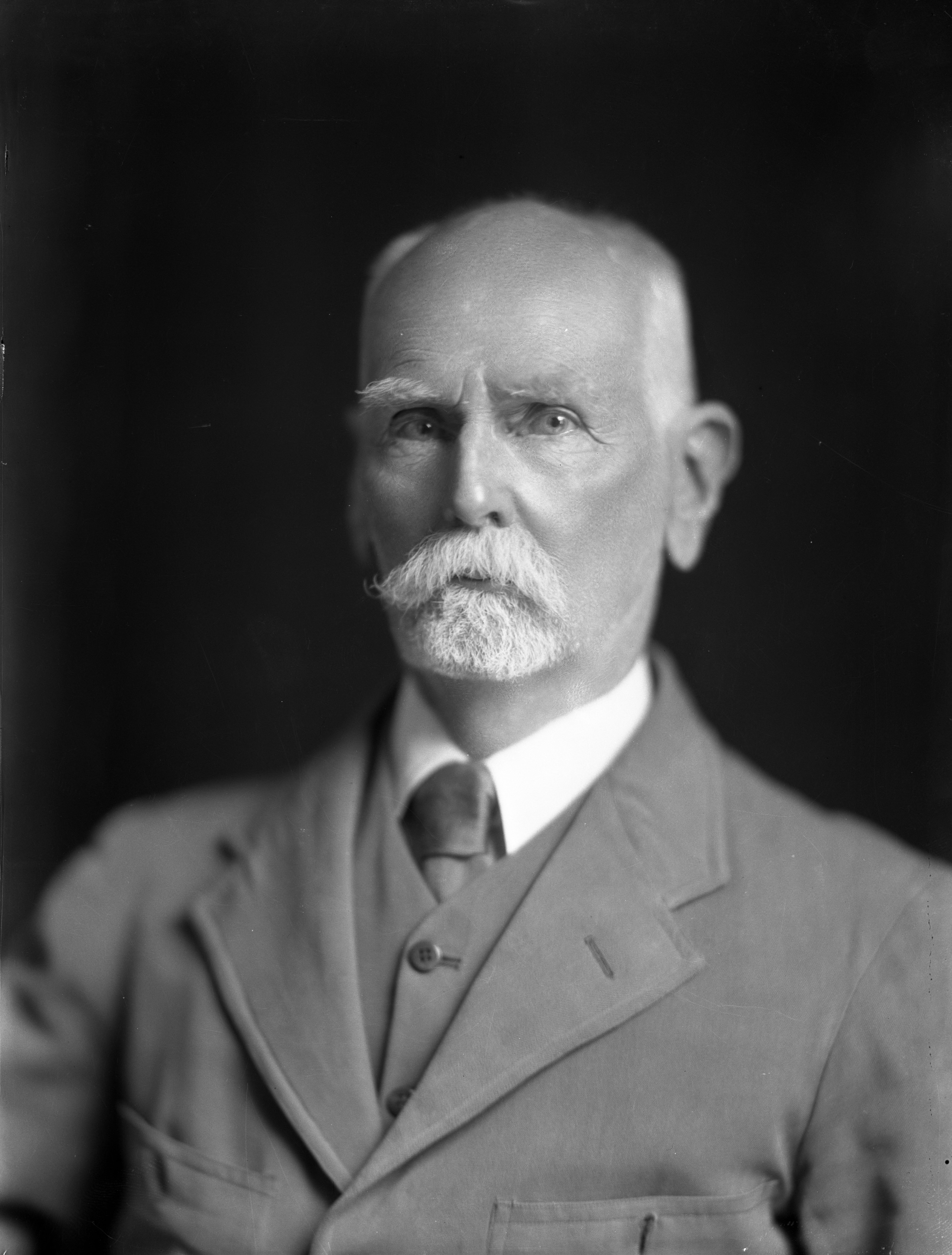
- Leonard Cockayne in 1928
- Born: 7 April 1855; Sheffield, England
- Died: 8 July 1934 (aged 79); Wellington, New Zealand
- Education: Wesley College, Sheffield
- Known for: Plant ecology and theories of hybridisation
- Spouse: Maria Maude Blakeley
- Children: Alfred Cockayne
- Awards: Hector Memorial Medal; Hutton Medal; Mueller Medal; Veitch Memorial Medal
- Scientific career
- Fields: Botany
- Author abbrev. (botany): Cockayne

Leonard Cockayne CMG FRS (7 April 1855 – 8 July 1934) is regarded as New Zealand's greatest botanist and a founder of Western science in New Zealand.

== Biography ==
He was born in Sheffield, England where he attended Wesley College. He travelled to Australia in 1877 and shortly moved on to New Zealand where he became established as a botanist. He married Maria Maude Blakeley in Dunedin on 26 February 1881.

In June 1901, he attended the first conference of horticulturists in New Zealand at Dunedin where he presented a paper on the plants of the Chatham Islands and advocated the establishment of experimental plant research stations in New Zealand. This helped to establish Cockayne's reputation.

Cockayne was a member of the 1907 Sub-Antarctic Islands Scientific Expedition. The main aim of the expedition was to extend the magnetic survey of New Zealand by investigating the Auckland and Campbell Islands, but botanical, biological and zoological surveys were also conducted. The voyage also resulted in rescue of the castaways of the Dundonald shipwreck in the Auckland Islands.

Cockayne's major contributions to botany were in plant ecology and in his theories of hybridisation. In 1899 he published the first New Zealand account of successional changes in vegetation. Between 1897 and 1930 he published 49 papers in the Transactions and Proceedings of the Royal Society of New Zealand.

He was elected Fellow of the Royal Society in 1912 on the proposal of Sir J. D. Hooker and was awarded the Hector Memorial Medal by the Royal Society of New Zealand in that same year. In 1914 he was awarded the Hutton Medal by the Royal Society of New Zealand, in 1928 the Mueller Medal by the Australian and New Zealand Association for the Advancement of Science, and in 1932 the Veitch Memorial Medal of the Royal Horticultural Society. In 1928, the Royal Society awarded Cockayne the Darwin Medal "for the eminence of his contributions to ecological botany". At the time, the Darwin Medal had only been awarded to 19 others in the world.

Cockayne corresponded frequently with famous botanists all over the world. This helped facilitate the publication of New Zealand papers in overseas journals. He was also instrumental in bringing visitors to New Zealand. Johannes Paulus Lotsy, the Dutch botanist, lectured on the place of hybrids in evolution.|page=10 The Swedish couple Einar and Greta Du Rietz stayed six months in the summer of 1926–27 collecting from the Far North to the subantarctic islands, paying special attention to lichens. The director of Kew Gardens, Sir Arthur Hill, came in 1928.

Cockayne also assisted and encouraged fellow botanists in their work. He was thanked by co-authors Robert Malcolm Laing and Ellen Wright Blackwell in the preface of their classic book of New Zealand biology Plants of New Zealand for "helping us over many slippery places and for much generous assistance freely given”. He encouraged Charles Ethelbert Foweraker, later senior lecturer in botany, and sometime lecturer in charge of the Forestry School, at the University of Canterbury, in his career, the two men having first corresponded in 1911 when Cockayne was writing The Vegetation of New Zealand; the two went together on many expeditions in Marlborough and Canterbury.

In the 1929 King's Birthday Honours, Cockayne was appointed a Companion of the Order of St Michael and St George, for honorary scientific services to the New Zealand government.

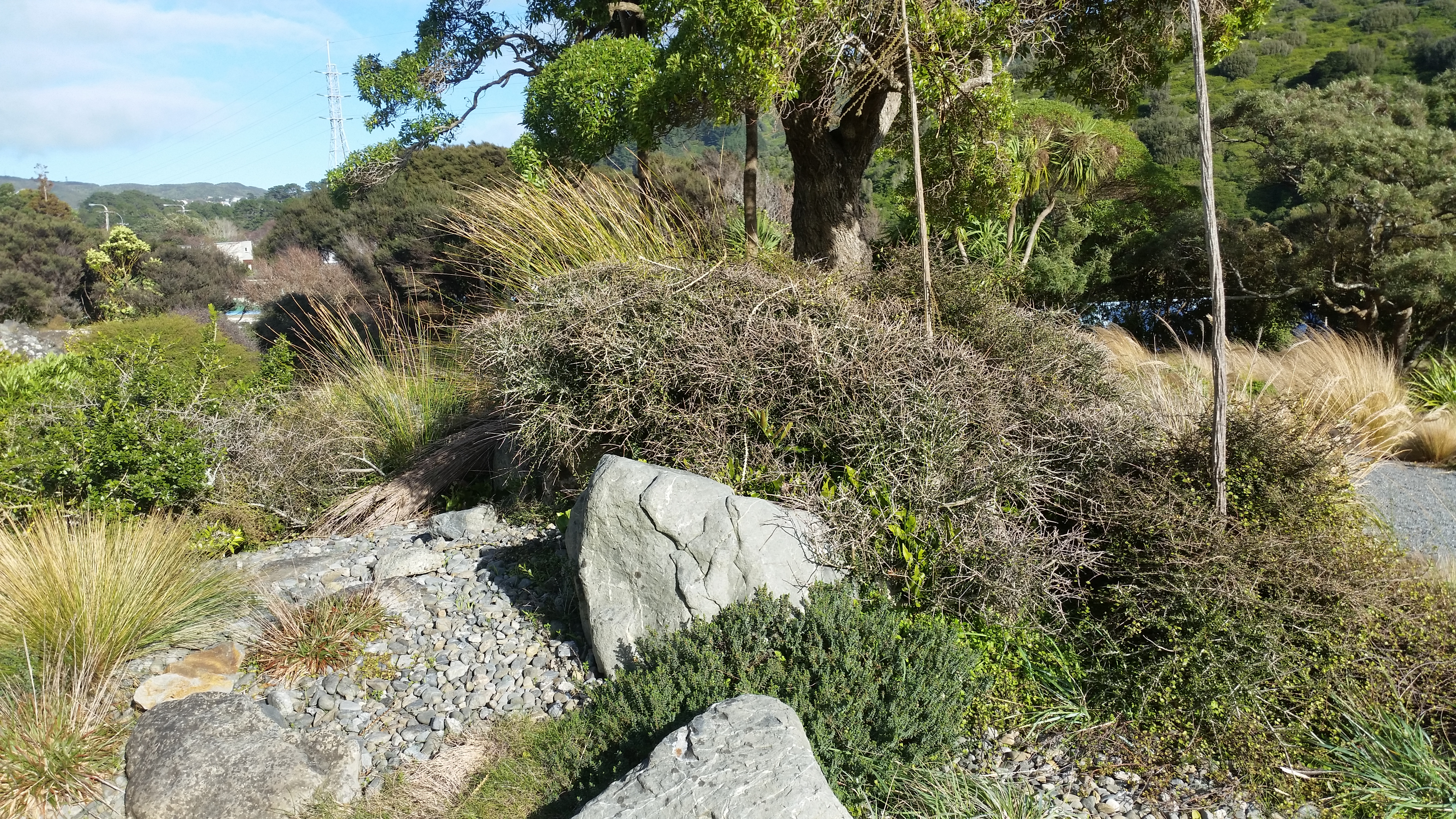
The grave site of Cockayne and his wife Maude at Ōtari-Wilton's Bush in Wellington

The Cockayne Reserve in Christchurch, Cockayne Memorial Garden at Christchurch Botanic Gardens, the Cockayne Nature Walk near Otira on the West Coast, and the Leonard Cockayne Centre and Cockayne Lookout at Ōtari-Wilton's Bush (a garden in Wellington dedicated solely to New Zealand native plants), are all named after him. His son Alfred Cockayne also became a noted botanist.

Cockayne died on 8 July 1934 in Wellington, and is buried along with his wife Maude, in Ōtari-Wilton's Bush.

== Bibliography ==
- New Zealand Plants and Their Story 1910
- Observations Concerning Evolution, Derived from Ecological Studies in New Zealand
- Vegetation of New Zealand
- The Cultivation of New Zealand Plants 1923
- Trees of New Zealand (with E. Phillips Turner)
- Report on the dune-areas of New Zealand: their geology, botany and reclamation.
- Report on a botanical survey of Stewart Island
- Dr. L. Cockayne, C.M.G., F.R.S.; Dr. E. Teichelmann (1930), The Glacial scenic reserves of Westland, Wellington: John Mackay, Wikidata Q105575762
- Cockayne, Leonard (1921). Die Vegetation der Erde. Sammlung pflanzengeographischer monographien (in German). Vol. XIV: The Vegetation of New Zealand. Leipzig: W. Engelmann.
