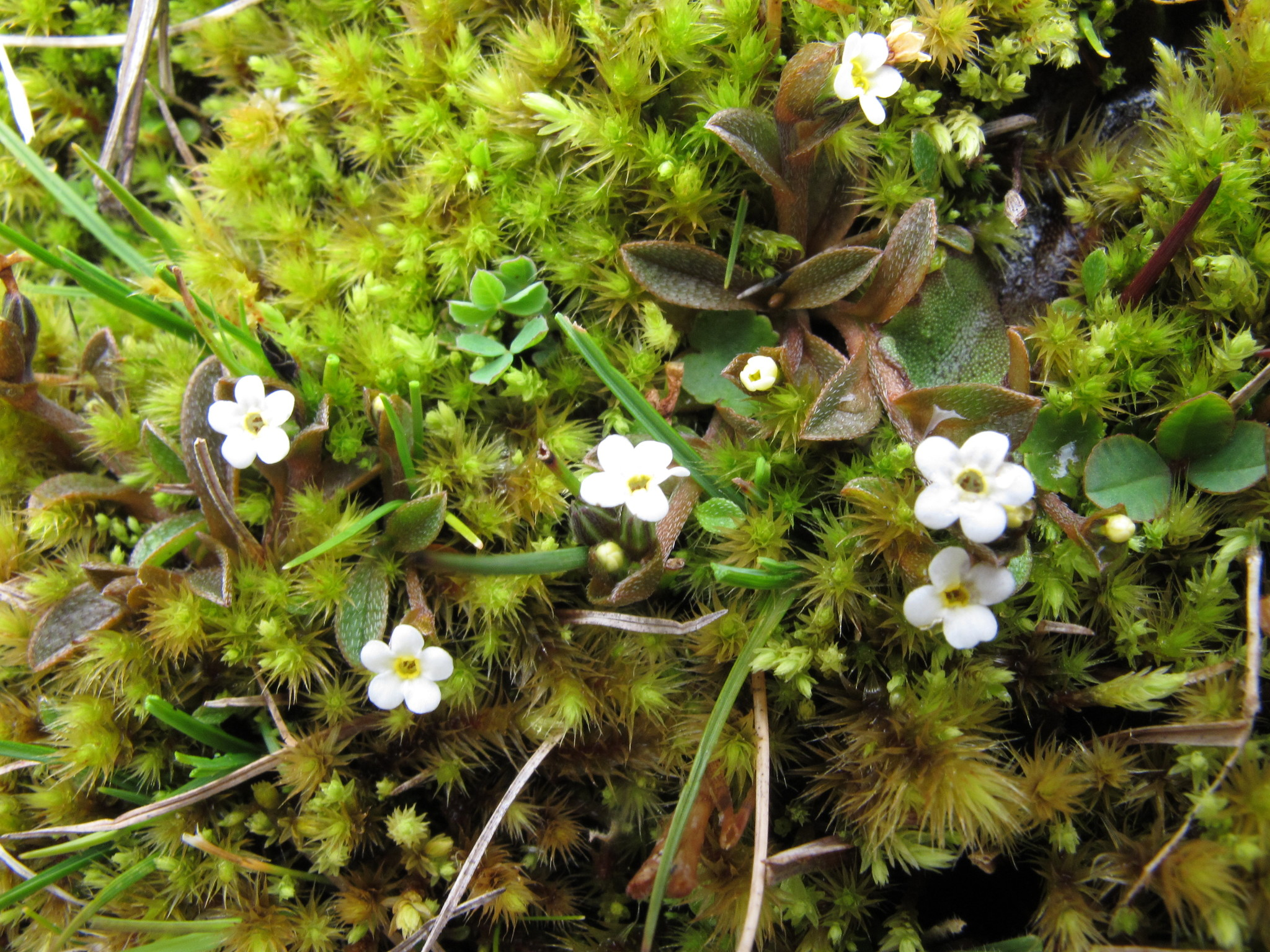

Conservation status
- Naturally Uncommon (NZ TCS)

Scientific classification
- Kingdom: Plantae
- Clade: Tracheophytes
- Clade: Angiosperms
- Clade: Eudicots
- Clade: Asterids
- Order: Boraginales
- Family: Boraginaceae
- Genus: Myosotis
- Species: M. bryonoma

Binomial name
- Myosotis bryonoma Meudt, Prebble and Thorsen

= Myosotis bryonoma =

Species of flowering plant

Myosotis bryonoma is a species of flowering plant in the family Boraginaceae, endemic to the South Island of New Zealand. Heidi Meudt, Jessica Prebble and Michael Thorsen described the species. Plants of this species of forget-me-not are perennial with a creeping habit, bracteate inflorescences, and white corollas.

== Taxonomy and etymology ==
Myosotis bryonoma Meudt et al. is in the plant family Boraginaceae and was originally described in 2018 by Heidi Meudt, Jessica Prebble and Michael Thorsen. It is morphologically most similar to M. tenericaulis, another creeping, bracteate-prostrate species of Myosotis, and also shares some morphological characters with other bracteate-prostrate species, M. colensoi and M. cheesemanii. It can be distinguished from M. tenericaulis by its shorter (<5 mm long) and wider (>0.7 mm) petioles, smaller leaves (generally <6 mm long), appressed trichomes that are parallel to the mid vein, rosette leaves that are glabrous on the underside, shorter inflorescences (10–45 mm long) and internodes (<5 mm), and fewer flowers per inflorescence (1–3). M. bryonoma can be distinguished from M. colensoi and M. cheesemanii by its shorter rosette leaf petioles (< 4 mm long), shorter calyces (< 3.5 mm long at flowering), calyx lobes which are longer than half the length of the calyx, rosette leaves usually glabrous abaxially, and shorter corolla tube (< 4.3 mm long).

The type specimen of Myosotis bryonoma is lodged at the herbarium (WELT) of the Museum of New Zealand, Te Papa Tongarewa.

The specific epithet, bryonoma, is derived from Greek words meaning ‘dwelling in moss’, i.e. bryon (moss) and nomos (place or condition for living), and refers to this species' habitat. The specific epithet was inspired by submissions from the public to give the species a new name.

== Phylogeny ==
Myosotis bryonoma was shown to be a part of the monophyletic southern hemisphere lineage of Myosotis in phylogenetic analyses of standard DNA sequencing markers (nuclear ribosomal DNA and chloroplast DNA regions). Within the southern hemisphere lineage, species relationships were not well resolved. The sequences of two individuals of M. bryonoma (as M. aff. tenericaulis) grouped mainly with individuals of other small bracteate-prostrate species in the nuclear ribosomal DNA dataset, but were in a central, unresolved position in the chloroplast DNA dataset.

A 2025 phylogenomic study based on DNA from whole plastids, target capture of universal angiosperm bait markers, and the full nuclear ribosomal DNA cistron, included seven individuals of M. bryonoma. The species was monophyletic with high support in the target capture dataset, but not in the other two data sets. In all data sets, M. bryonoma individuals were found in clades with other South Island bracteate-prostrate species including M. antarctica, M. glauca, M. hikuwai, M. lyallii, M. ultramafica and M. umbrosa.

== Description ==
Myosotis bryonoma plants are single rosettes. The rosette leaves are few and have petioles 1–7 mm long. The rosette leaf blades are 2–7 mm long by 1–5 mm wide (length: width ratio 1.0–2.9: 1), narrowly obovate to very broadly obovate or ovate to very broadly ovate, usually widest at or above the middle, with an obtuse apex. The upper and lower surfaces of the leaf are sparsely to densely covered in straight, appressed, antrorse (forward-facing) hairs that are parallel to the mid vein. Each rosette has 1–5 ascending or prostrate, usually unbranched, bracteate inflorescences that are 10–45 cm long. The cauline leaves are similar in size, shape and hairs to the rosette leaves. There can be up to 3 flowers in each inflorescence, each one borne on a short pedicel and with a cauline leaf. The calyx is 1–3 mm long at flowering and 2–3 mm long at fruiting, lobed to half or nearly all of its length, and densely covered in short, straight, antrorse hairs. The corolla is white and up to 6 mm in diameter, with a cylindrical tube, petals that are obovate and flat, and small yellow scales alternating with the petals. The anthers are fully included inside the corolla tube, or sometimes partly exserted, with the tips only surpassing the scales. The four smooth, shiny, light brown nutlets are 1.1–1.9 mm long by 0.7–1.1 mm wide and ovoid in shape.

Myosotis bryonoma has M. australis type pollen.

The chromosome number of M. bryonoma is unknown.

It flowers and fruits from November to February.

== Distribution and habitat ==
Myosotis bryonoma is endemic to the South Island of New Zealand in Otago from (720–)970–1700 m elevation. It is restricted to high-elevation mountain bogs and other damp to saturated habitats, often with mosses, cushions and other small herbs.

== Conservation status ==
The species is listed as At Risk - Naturally Uncommon in the most recent assessment (2023) of the New Zealand Threatened Classification for plants, which was unchanged from the 2017 assessment. It also has the qualifiers "DPS" (Data Poor Size), "DPT" (Data Poor Trend), "RR" (Range Restricted) and "Sp" (Sparse).

== Gallery ==
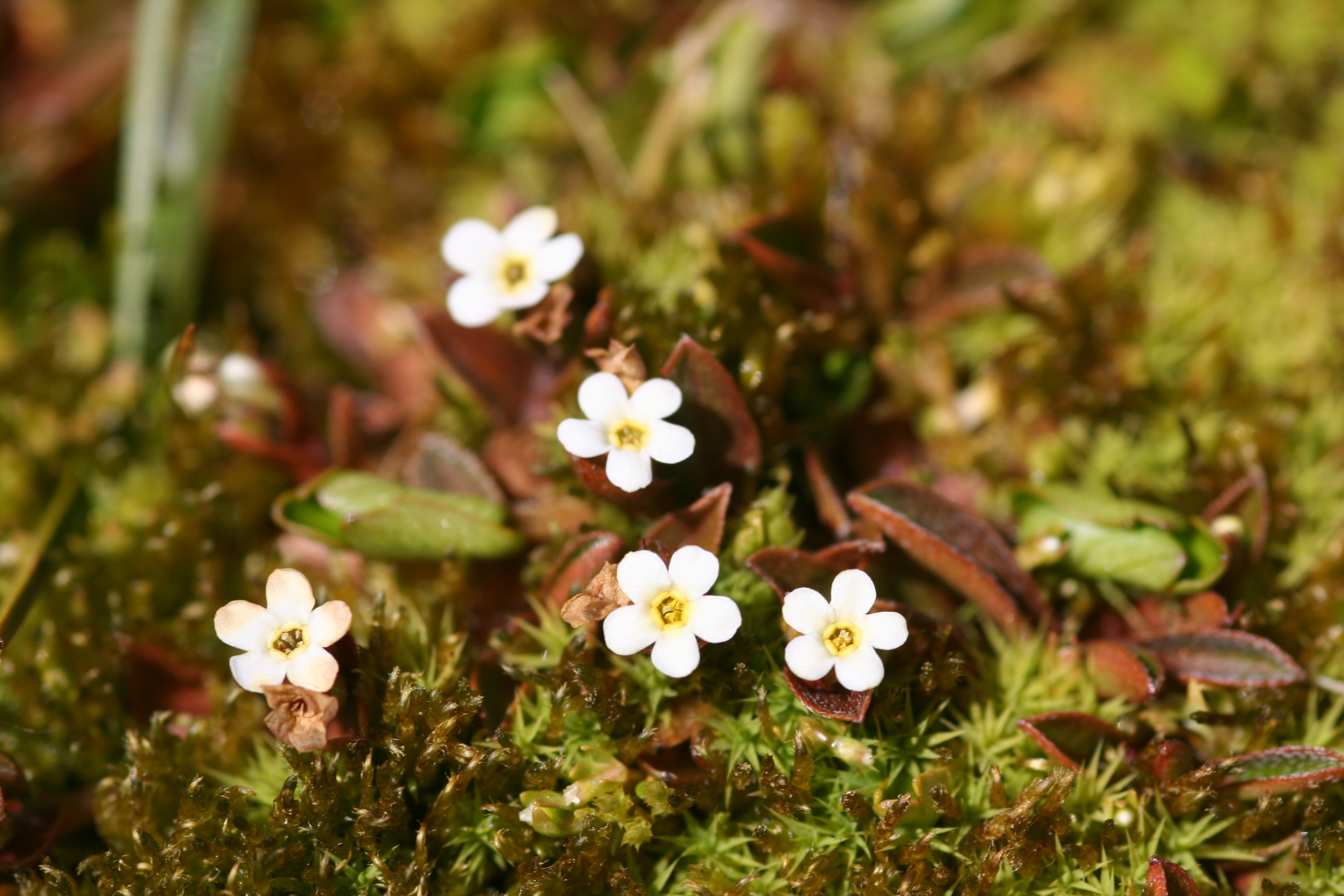
Flowers

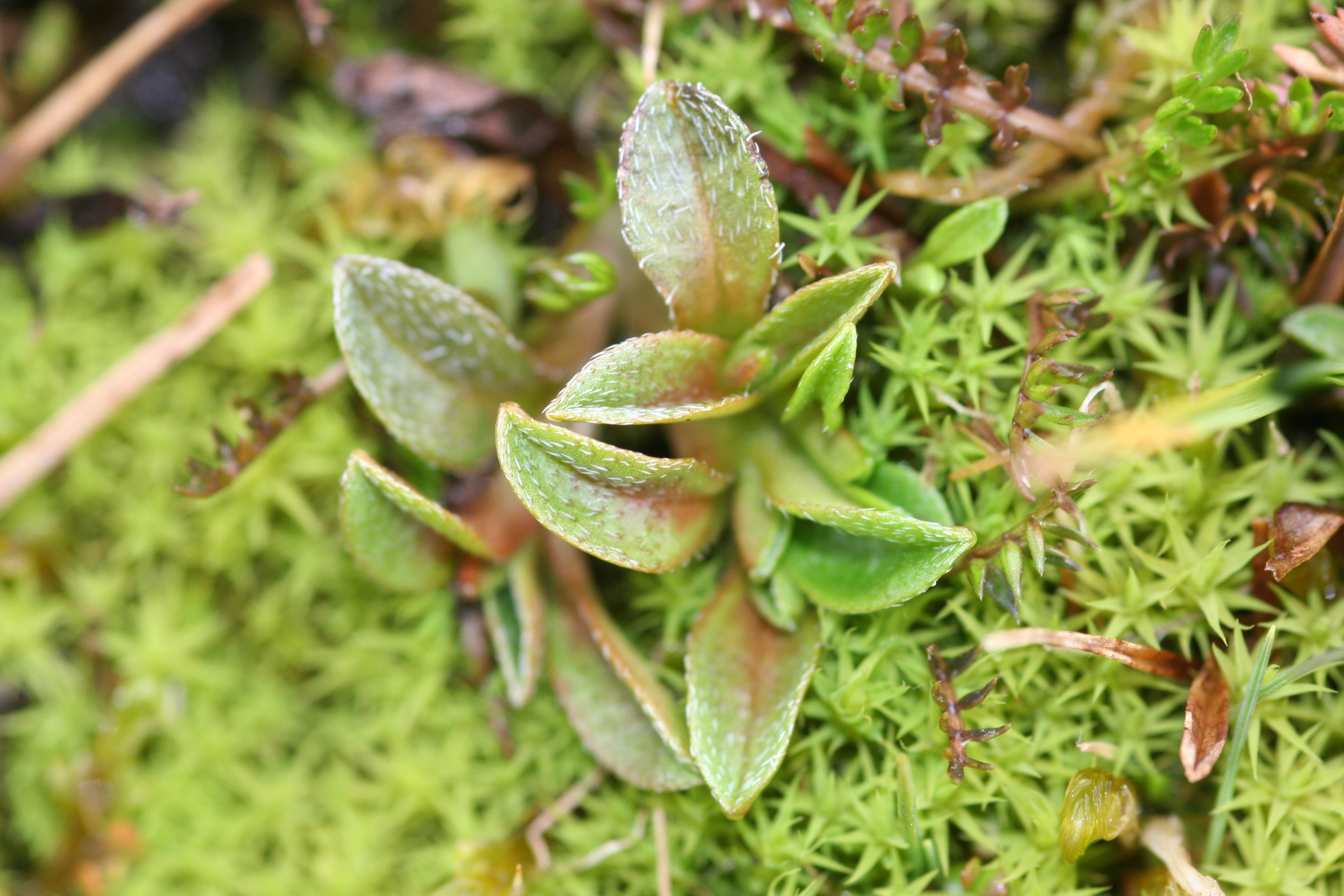
Rosette leaves

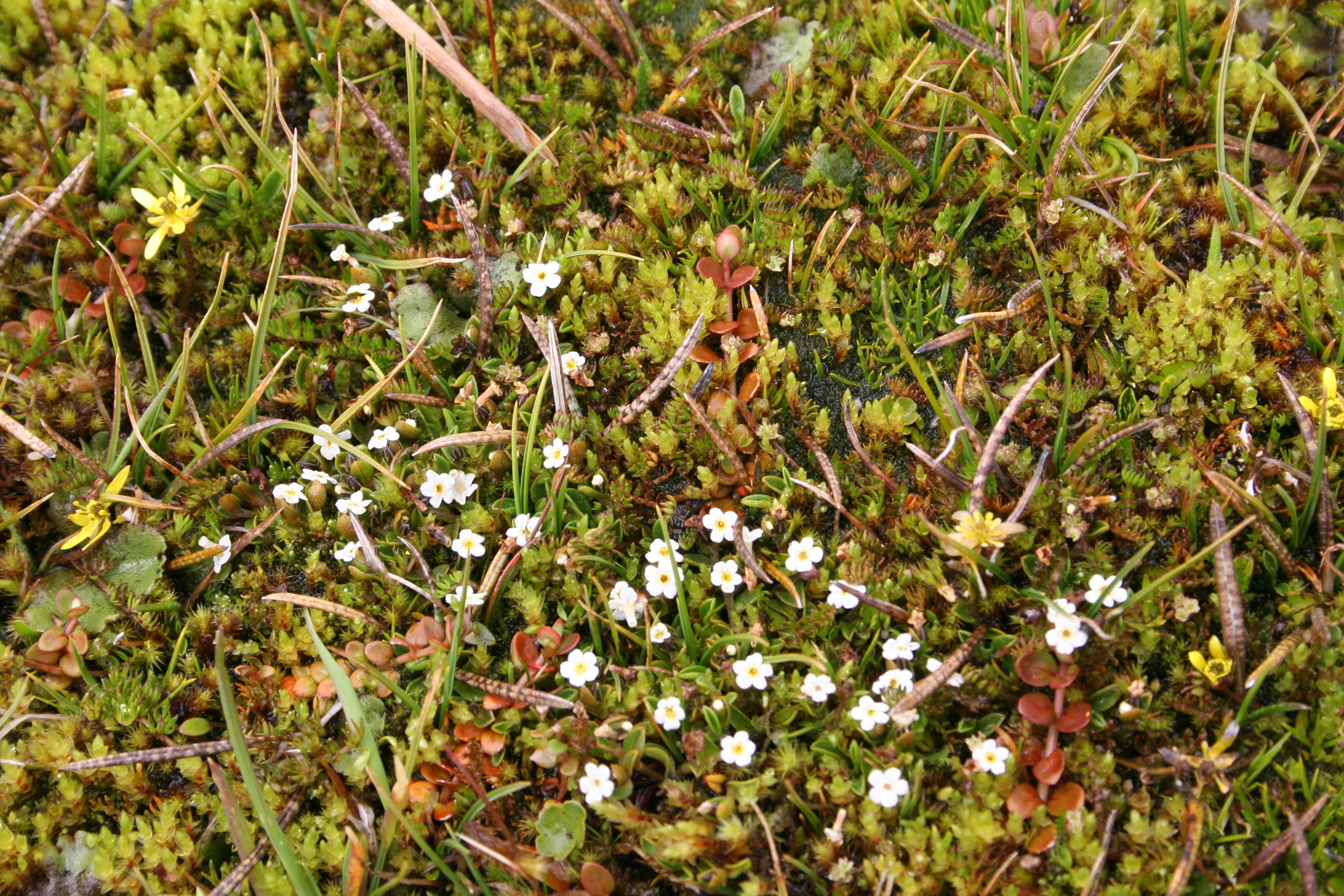
Flowering plants

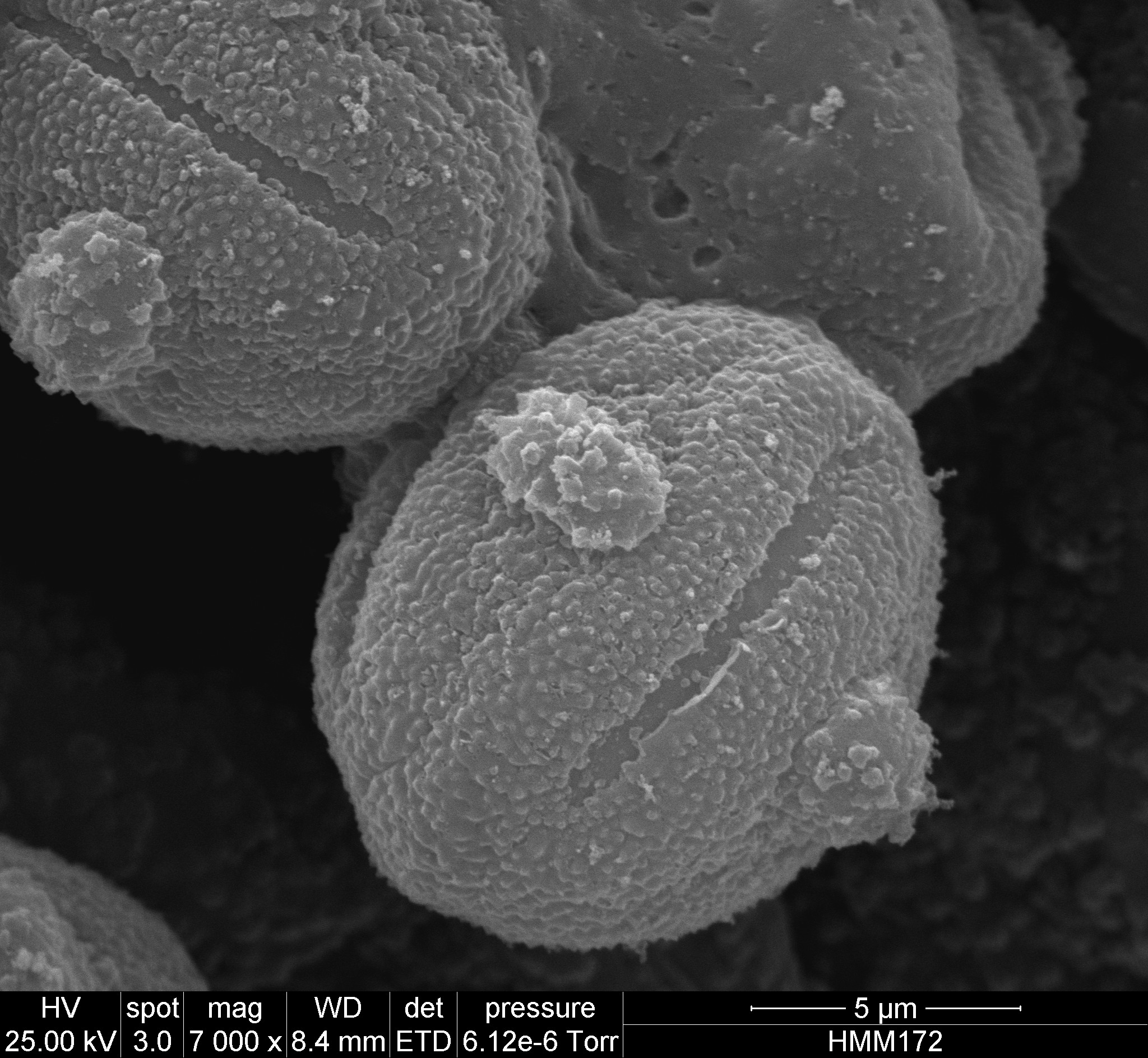
Pollen
