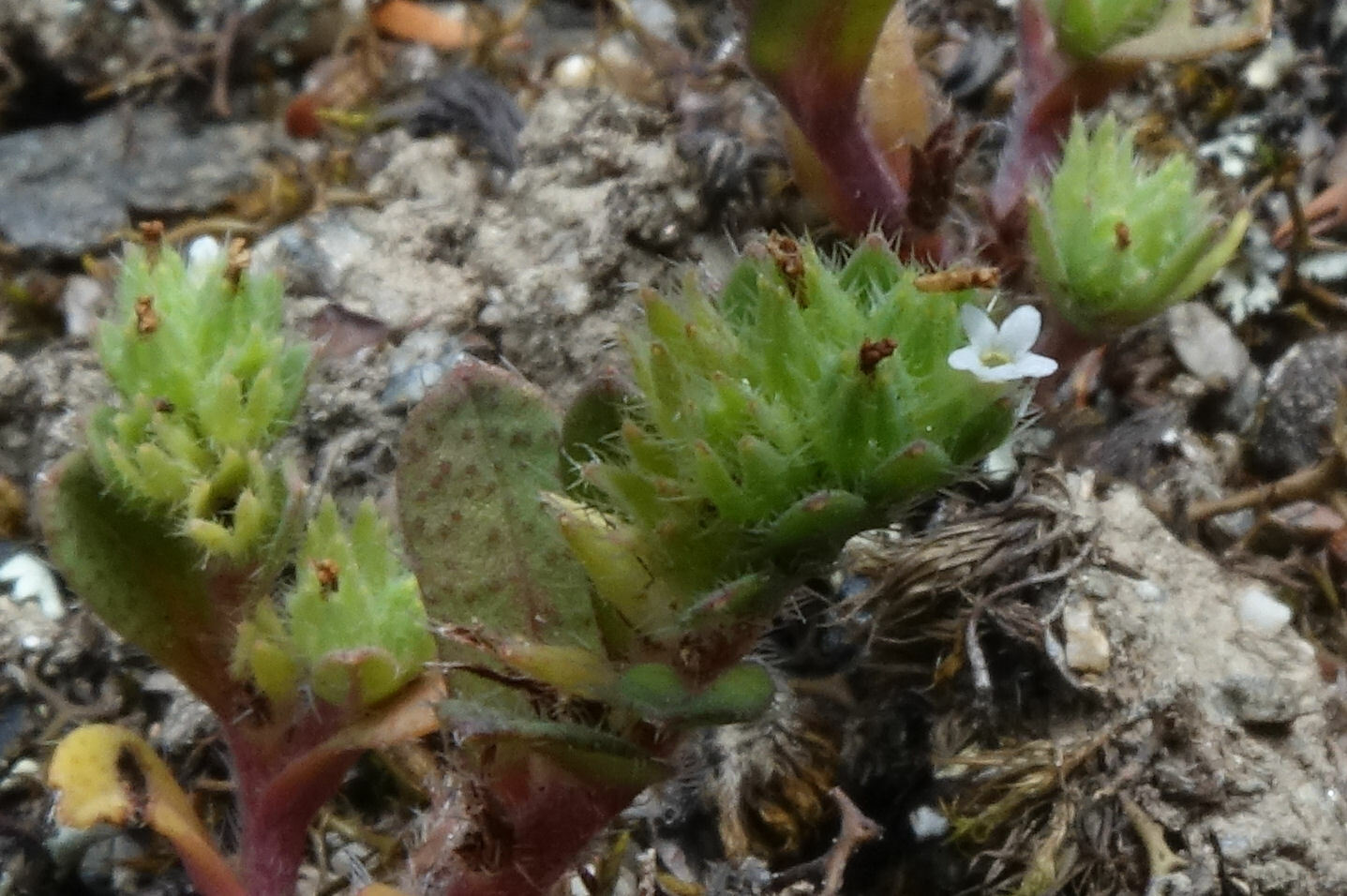
- Close up of Myosotis hikuwai

Conservation status
- Nationally Critical (NZ TCS)

Scientific classification
- Kingdom: Plantae
- Clade: Tracheophytes
- Clade: Angiosperms
- Clade: Eudicots
- Clade: Asterids
- Order: Boraginales
- Family: Boraginaceae
- Genus: Myosotis
- Species: M. hikuwai

Binomial name
- Myosotis hikuwai Meudt, Prebble & G.M.Rogers

= Myosotis hikuwai =

Species of flowering plant

Myosotis hikuwai is a species of flowering plant in the family Boraginaceae, endemic to the South Island of New Zealand. Heidi Meudt, Jessica Prebble and Geoff Rogers described M. hikuwai in 2022. Plants of this forget-me-not are spring annuals with bracteate and erect inflorescences, and small, white corollas with inserted stamens. The species is considered Threatened and known only from one population near Wānaka.

== Taxonomy and etymology ==
Myosotis hikuwai is in the plant family Boraginaceae. Specimens of this species were first photographed and collected in 2013 by Geoff Rogers. The species was described by Heidi Meudt, Jessica Prebble and Geoff Rogers in 2022. The holotype was collected by Geoff Rogers in Wānaka, Otago near the Clutha River / Mata-Au, and is lodged at the herbarium of the Museum of New Zealand Te Papa Tongarewa (WELT SP108906).

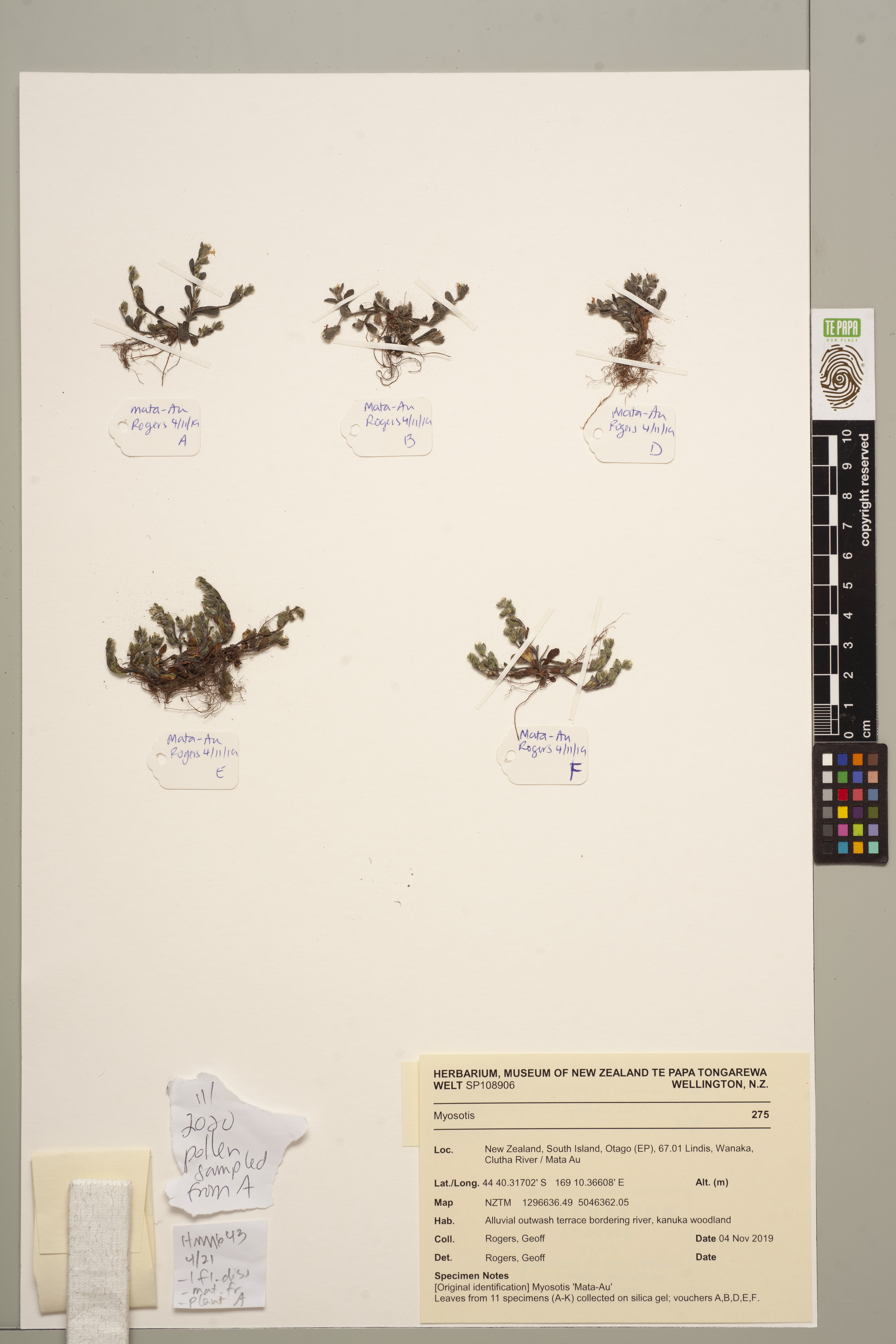
Myosotis hikuwai holotype

The specific epithet, hikuwai, is a te reo Māori word which means 'source of a stream'. It refers to the Hikuwai Conservation Area, which in turn likely refers to the source of the Clutha River / Mata-Au, the location of the only known population of M. hikuwai.

Morphological comparison of herbarium specimens showed that Myosotis hikuwai is most similar to the bracteate-prostrate species Myosotis brevis, M. antarctica, M. glauca and M. umbrosa. Myosotis hikuwai can be distinguished from these species by the combination of the following characters: erect habit (which is unusual for plants with bracteate inflorescences), many cauline leaves subtending the flowers, small corollas (corolla diameter <1.5 mm as measured on dried herbarium specimens), small nutlets (<1.2 mm long and <0.8 mm wide), patent hairs on the rosette leaves, straight hairs on many cauline- and rosette-leaf surfaces, calyces that are 1.9–3.0 mm long at flowering and 3.4–4.7 mm long at fruiting with sparsely distributed hairs.

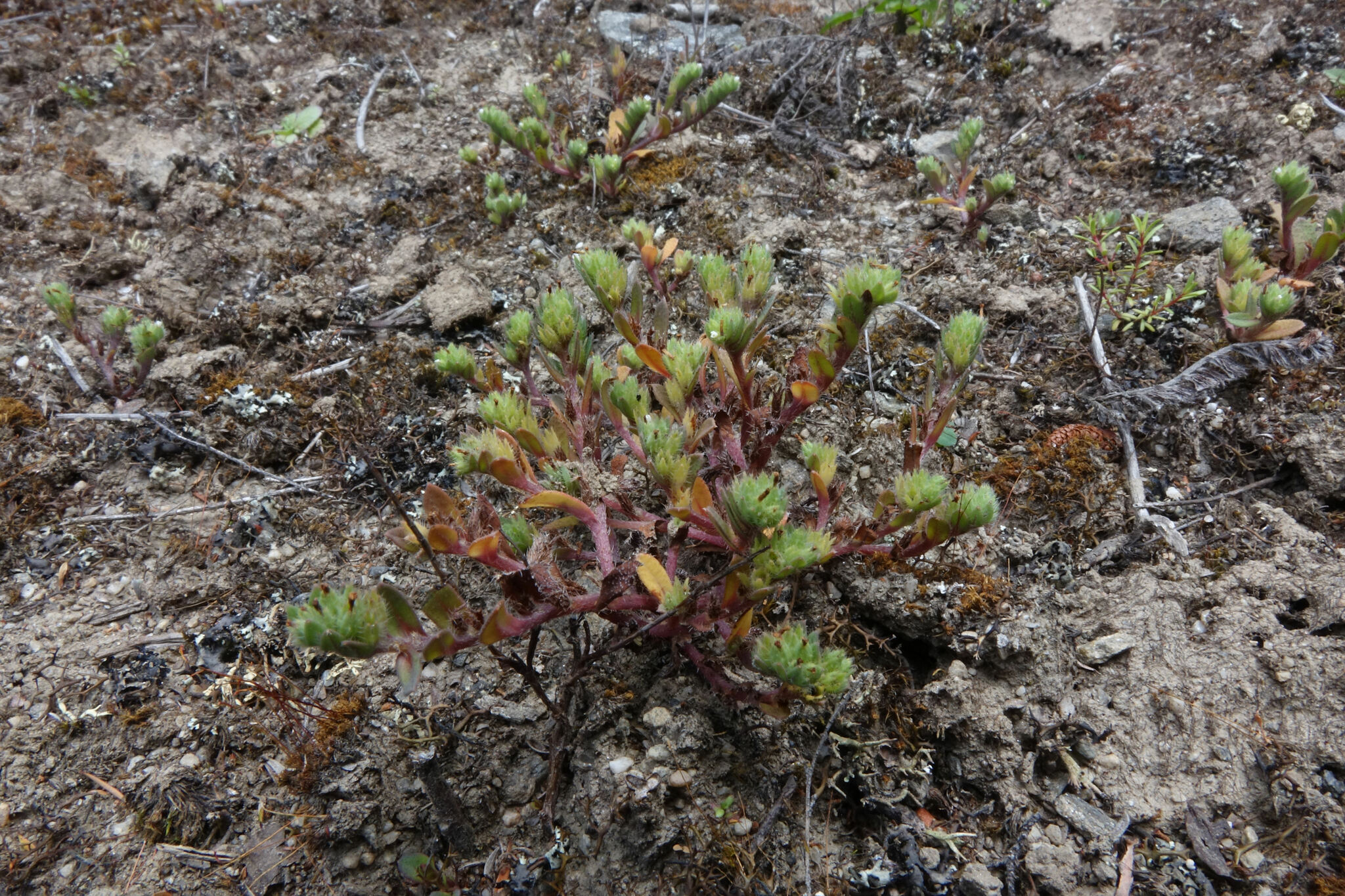
Myosotis hikuwai whole plant and habit

== Phylogeny ==
Myosotis hikuwai was not included in phylogenetic analyses of standard DNA sequencing markers (nuclear ribosomal DNA and chloroplast DNA regions). Within the southern hemisphere lineage, species relationships were not well resolved.

== Description ==
Myosotis hikuwai plants are single rosettes that are sometimes stoloniferous. The rosette leaves have petioles 4–5 mm long. The rosette leaf blades are 3–7 mm long by 2–3 mm wide (length: width ratio 1.3–2.7: 1), oblanceolate, narrowly obovate, obovate or broadly obovate, widest above the middle, with an obtuse apex. Both surfaces and the edges of the leaf are sparsely covered in patent, mostly straight or some flexuous, antrorse (forward-facing) hairs that are oriented parallel or slightly oblique to the mid vein. The undersurface of the leaf is sometimes less hairy or glabrous. Each rosette has 1–5 ascending to erect, once- or twice-branched bracteate inflorescences that are up to 40 mm long and are not bifurcating in a forked 'V' shape near the tips. The cauline leaves are up to 22 per inflorescence and are similar to the rosette leaves but smaller and decrease in size and become sessile toward the tip. Each inflorescence has up to 20 flowers, each borne on a pedicel up to 1.4 mm long at fruiting, and each with a bract. The calyx is 2–3 mm long at flowering and 3–5 mm long at fruiting, lobed to one-third to one-half its length, and densely covered in antrorse hairs that are patent and flexuous. The corolla is white, up to 2 mm in diameter (dried) and up to 3.6 mm in diameter (fresh), with a cylindrical tube, petals that are obovate or very broadly ovate, and small yellow scales alternating with the petals. The stamens are about 2–3 mm long (measured from the base of the calyx to the anther tips). The anthers are fully included and wholly below the scales. The four smooth, shiny, medium to dark brown nutlets are 1.0–1.2 mm long by about 0.7 mm wide and ovoid in shape.

The chromosome number of M. hikuwai is unknown.

M. hikuwai [as 'Myosotis sp. (unknown)', voucher WELT SP103892] has M. australis type pollen.

It is a spring annual plant, flowering September–November and fruiting November.

== Distribution and habitat ==
Myosotis hikuwai is a forget-me-not endemic to Otago, South Island, New Zealand, and is only known from a handful of specimens from one large population in the Hikuwai Conservation Area near Wānaka at about 300 m ASL. It is found on gravel alluvial outwash terraces near the river Clutha / Mata-Au, in open kānuka shrubland and is sympatric with Myosotis brevis and Myosotis glauca.

== Conservation status ==
Myosotis hikuwai was listed [as 'Myosotis aff. glauca (a) (WELT SP104520; “Mata-Au”)'] in the most recent assessment (2017-2018) under the New Zealand Threatened Classification system for plants as Threatened, Nationally Critical, A(1), with the qualifiers ‘Data Poor’ (DP) and ‘One Location’ (OL).
