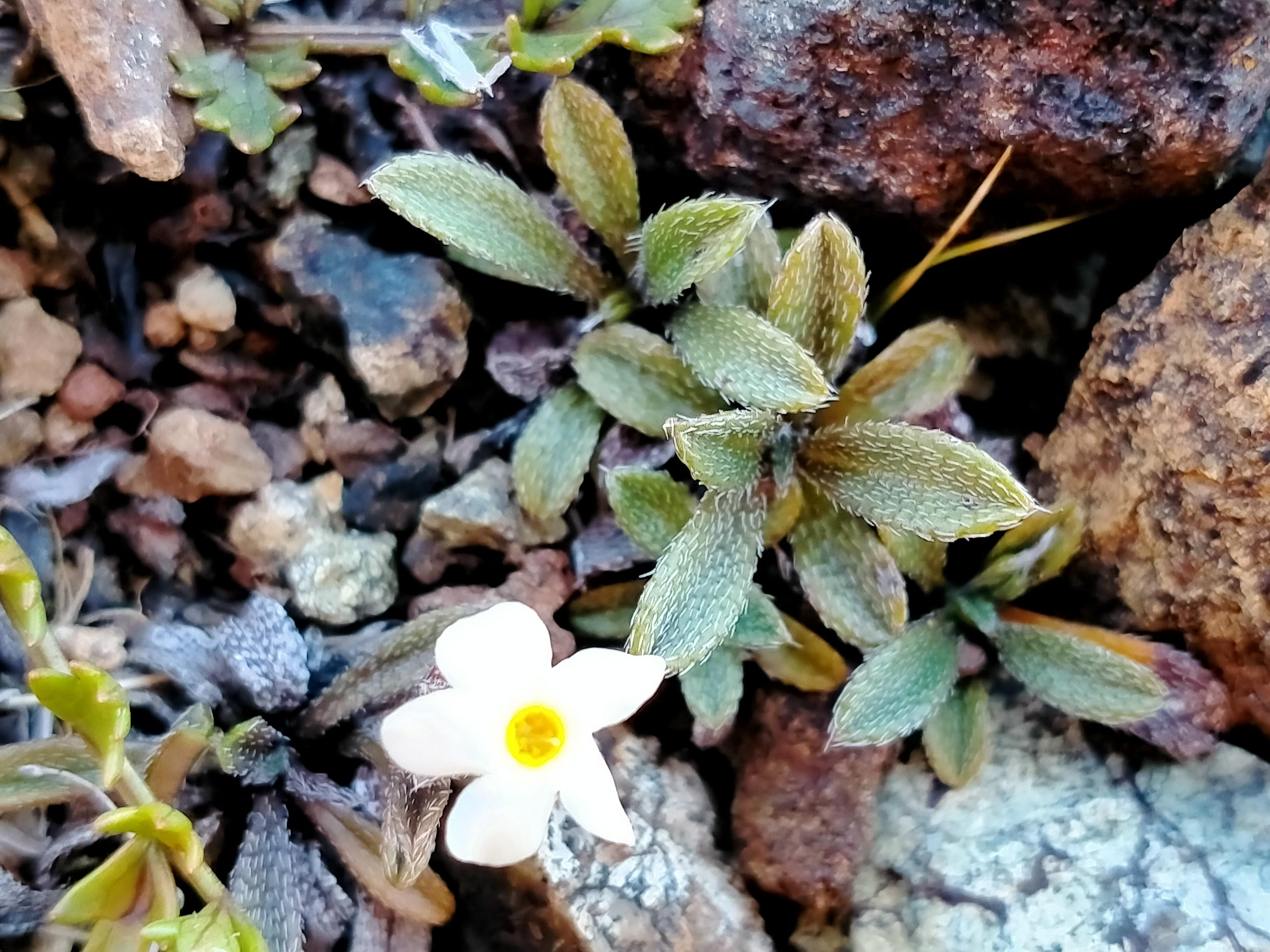
- Flowering plant of M. ultramafica

Scientific classification
- Kingdom: Plantae
- Clade: Tracheophytes
- Clade: Angiosperms
- Clade: Eudicots
- Clade: Asterids
- Order: Boraginales
- Family: Boraginaceae
- Genus: Myosotis
- Species: M. ultramafica

Binomial name
- Myosotis ultramafica Meudt, Prebble & Rance

= Myosotis ultramafica =

Species of flowering plant

Myosotis ultramafica is a species of flowering plant in the family Boraginaceae, endemic to the South Island of New Zealand. Heidi Meudt, Jessica Prebble and Brian Rance described M. ultramafica in 2022. Plants of this forget-me-not are perennial with bracteate and prostrate to ascending inflorescences, and small, white corollas with partly exserted stamens. This species is Naturally Uncommon and only found on ultramafic substrates.

== Taxonomy and etymology ==
Myosotis ultramafica Meudt, Prebble & Rance is in the plant family Boraginaceae. The species was described by Heidi Meudt, Jessica Prebble and Brian Rance in 2022. The holotype was collected by P.N. Johnson on West Dome, Southland, New Zealand and is lodged at the Allan Herbarium of Manaaki Whenua - Landcare Research (CHR 514988).

The specific epithet, ultramafica, refers to the type of substrate or base rock on which M. ultramafica is found. It is derived from the Latin word ultra ('beyond'), and the compound word mafic which describes modal ferromagnesian minerals.

Myosotis ultramafica has been previously confused with M. lyallii. However, morphological comparison of herbarium specimens showed that M. ultramafica is morphologically most similar to M. bryonoma, M. colensoi, M. glabrescens, M. glauca and especially M. cheesemanii. Both M. cheesemanii and M. ultramafica have straight, appressed hairs on the upper surface and edges of the rosette leaves, unbranched inflorescences, few cauline leaves, and few flowers with cauline leaves (which are characters that, at the same time, can distinguish both species from M. lyallii ). Myosotis ultramafica can be distinguished from M. cheesemanii and the other four species by its partially bracteate inflorescences, flexuous to curved hairs on the pedicels and calyces, long (>1.4 mm) and partially included anthers, and densely distributed calyx hairs.

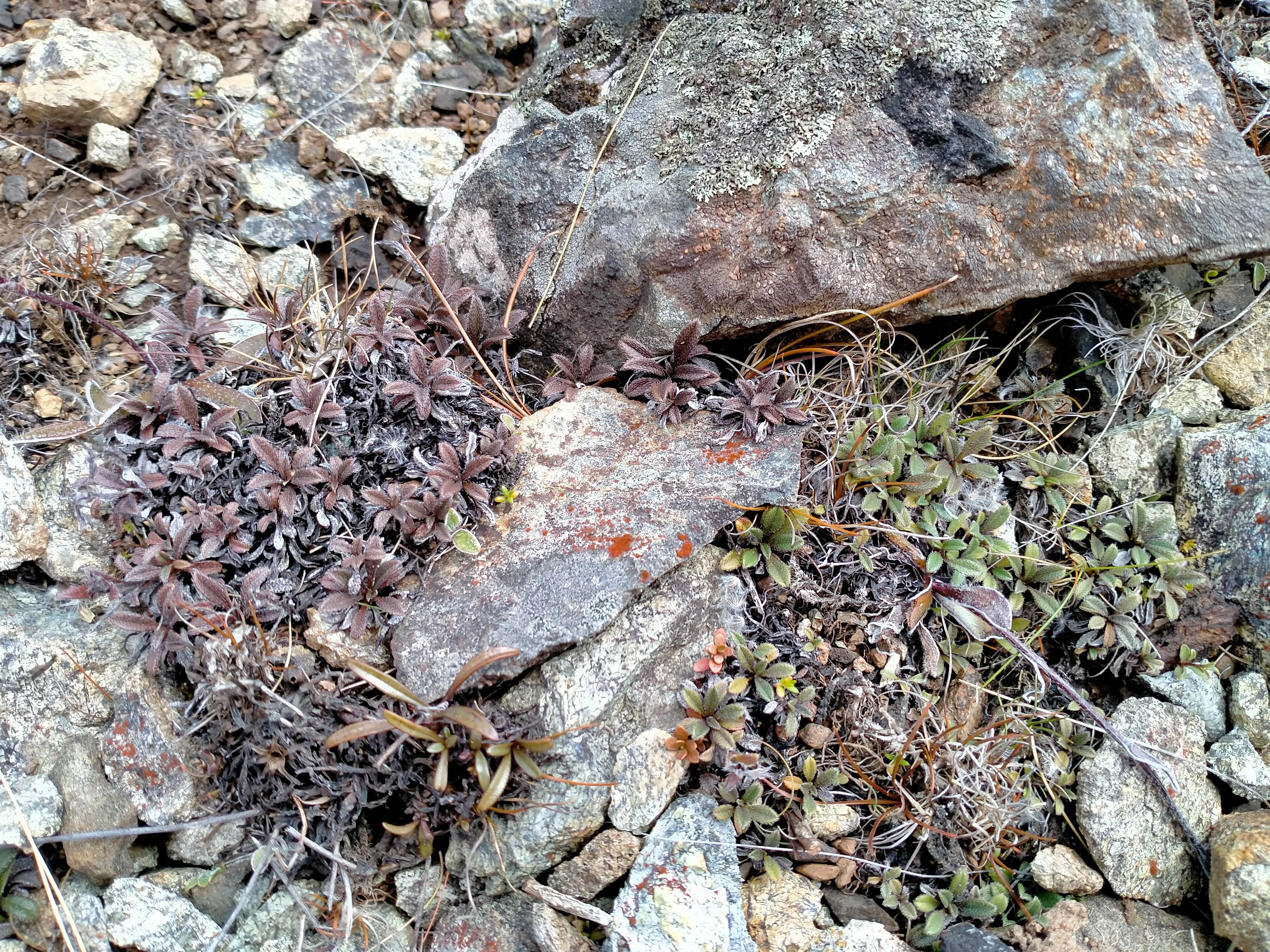
Plants in native, rocky ultramafic substrate

== Phylogeny ==
Myosotis ultramafica was not included in phylogenetic analyses of standard DNA sequencing markers (nuclear ribosomal DNA and chloroplast DNA regions). Within the southern hemisphere lineage, species relationships were not well resolved.

== Description ==
Myosotis ultramafica plants are single rosettes that are sometimes stoloniferous and can cluster together to form loose clumps. The rosette leaves have petioles 2–17 mm long. The rosette leaf blades are 4–12 mm long by 1.5–4 mm wide (length: width ratio 1.4–43: 1), usually oblanceolate or narrowly obovate, and widest above the middle, with an obtuse (rarely acute) apex. The upper and lower surfaces and edges of the leaf are densely covered in mostly straight (some flexuous), mostly appressed (some patent), antrorse (forward-facing) hairs that are oriented mostly parallel to the mid vein. The hairs on the undersurface of the leaf are sometimes only patchily distributed near the leaf tip and on the mid vein. Each rosette has 1–9 ascending, unbranched partially bracteate inflorescences that are up to 71 mm long. The cauline leaves are up to 7 per inflorescence and are similar to the rosette leaves but smaller and decrease in size and become sessile toward the tip. Each inflorescence has up to 7 flowers, each borne on a pedicel up to 4 mm long at fruiting, and the lowest 1–3 flowers with a bract. The calyx is 4–5 mm long at flowering and 5–9 mm long at fruiting, lobed about one-third its length, and densely covered in antrorse (or a mixture of antrorse and retrorse) hairs that are mostly flexuous, and appressed to patent. The corolla is white, up to 8 mm in diameter, with a cylindrical tube, petals that are obovate or narrowly obovate, and small yellow scales alternating with the petals. The stamens are 7–8 mm long (measured from the base of the calyx to the anther tips). The anthers are partly exserted, with the tips only just surpassing the scales. The four smooth, shiny, dark brown nutlets are 1.4–1.9 mm long by 0.8–1.1 mm wide and narrowly ovoid or ovoid in shape.

The chromosome number of M. ultramafica is unknown.

The pollen of M. ultramafica is unknown.

It flowers in December–February and fruits from January–February.

== Distribution and habitat ==
Myosotis ultramafica is a forget-me-not endemic to ultramafic areas of Southland, South Island, New Zealand, from 605 to 1300 m ASL, currently known from the following nearby locations: West Dome, Bald Hill, Black Ridge and the Livingstone Mountains. It is found on gravel pavements or in stonefields, on ultramafic substrates (such as serpentinite) on slopes or terraces, amongst tussocks and mānuka shrubs and often found with Gingidia decipiens, Gentianella serotina, Carex uncifolia and Wahlenbergia albomarginata.

== Conservation status ==
Myosotis ultramafica was listed as At Risk – Naturally Uncommon with the qualifiers Range Restricted (RR) and Sparse (Sp) in the 2012-2013 assessment under the New Zealand Threatened Classification system for plants, as M. aff. lyallii (Mossburn, CHR 320240). It was not listed in the most recent assessment (2017-2018) under the New Zealand Threatened Classification system for plants, but a recent study recommends it be listed as Threatened in the next assessment.

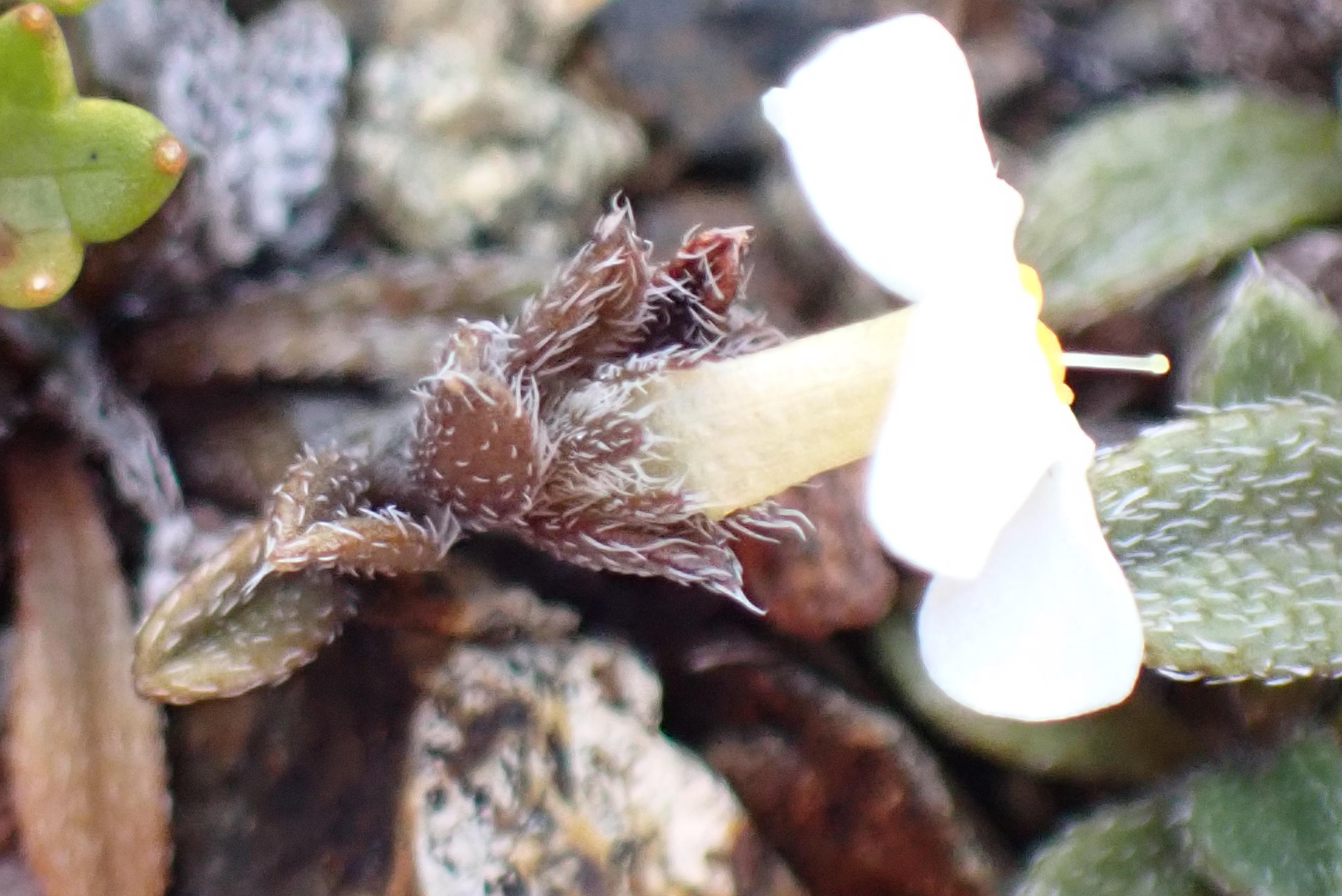
Flower, side view

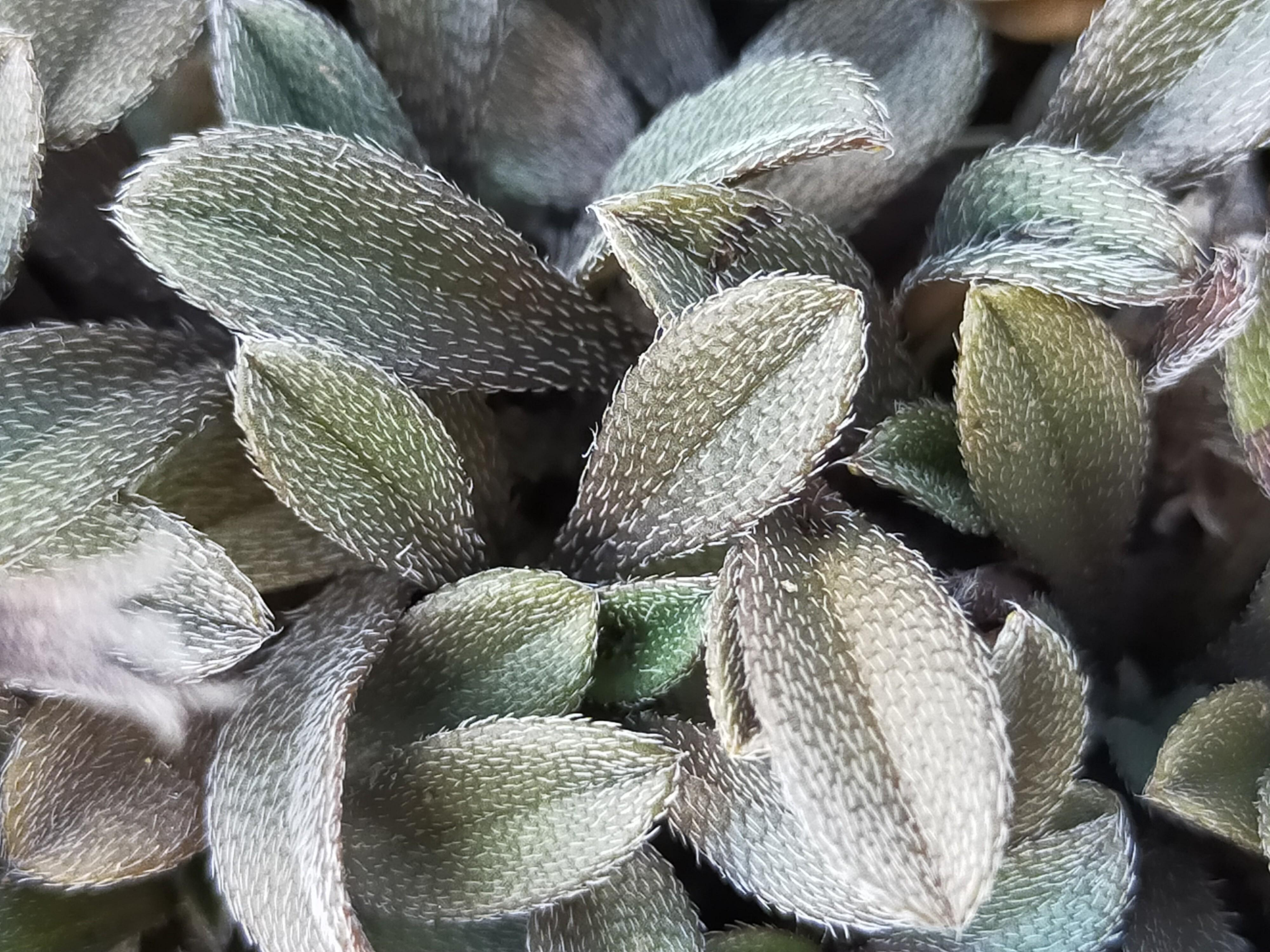
Leaves with straight, appressed leaf hairs

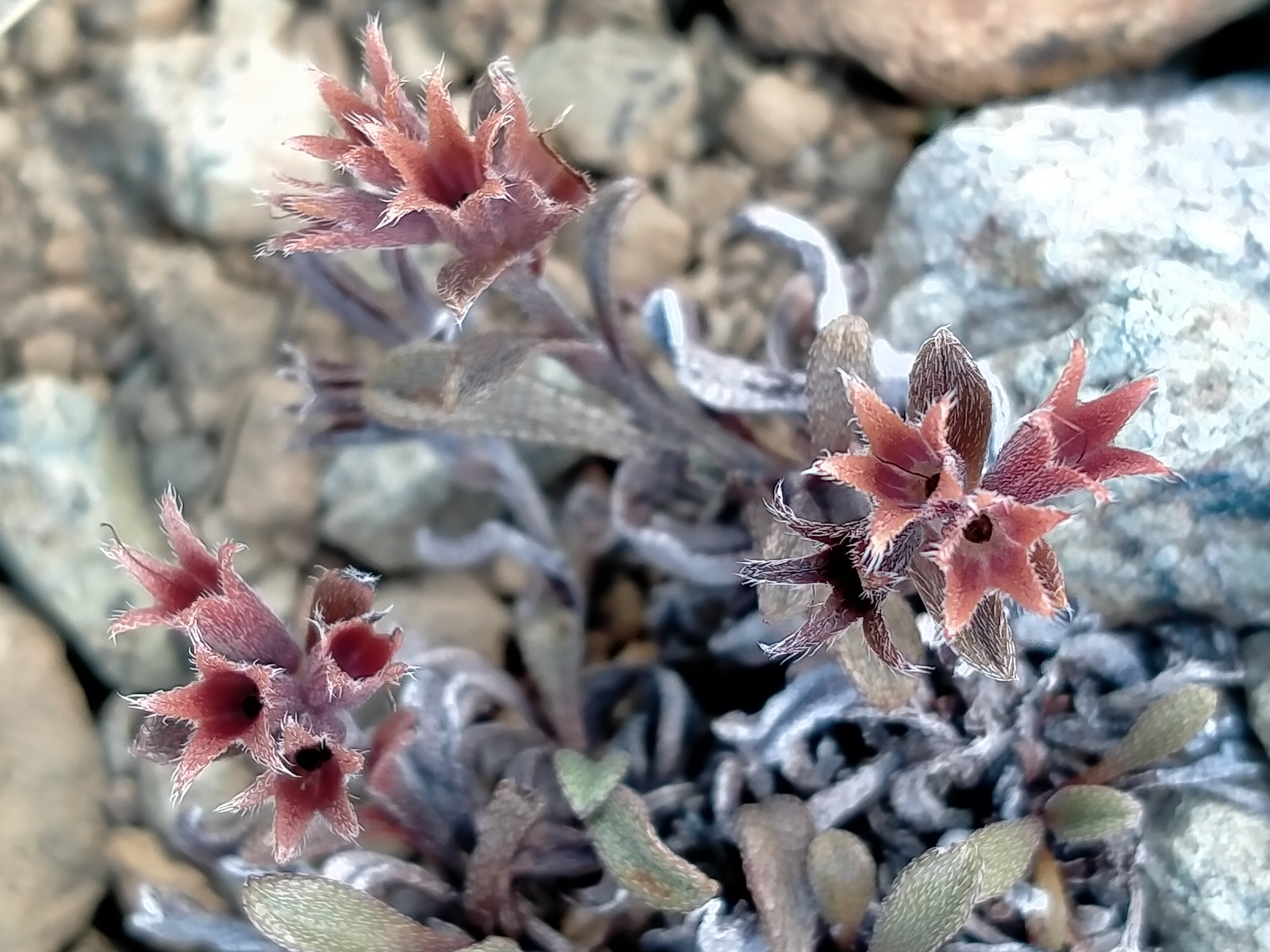
Fruiting calyces

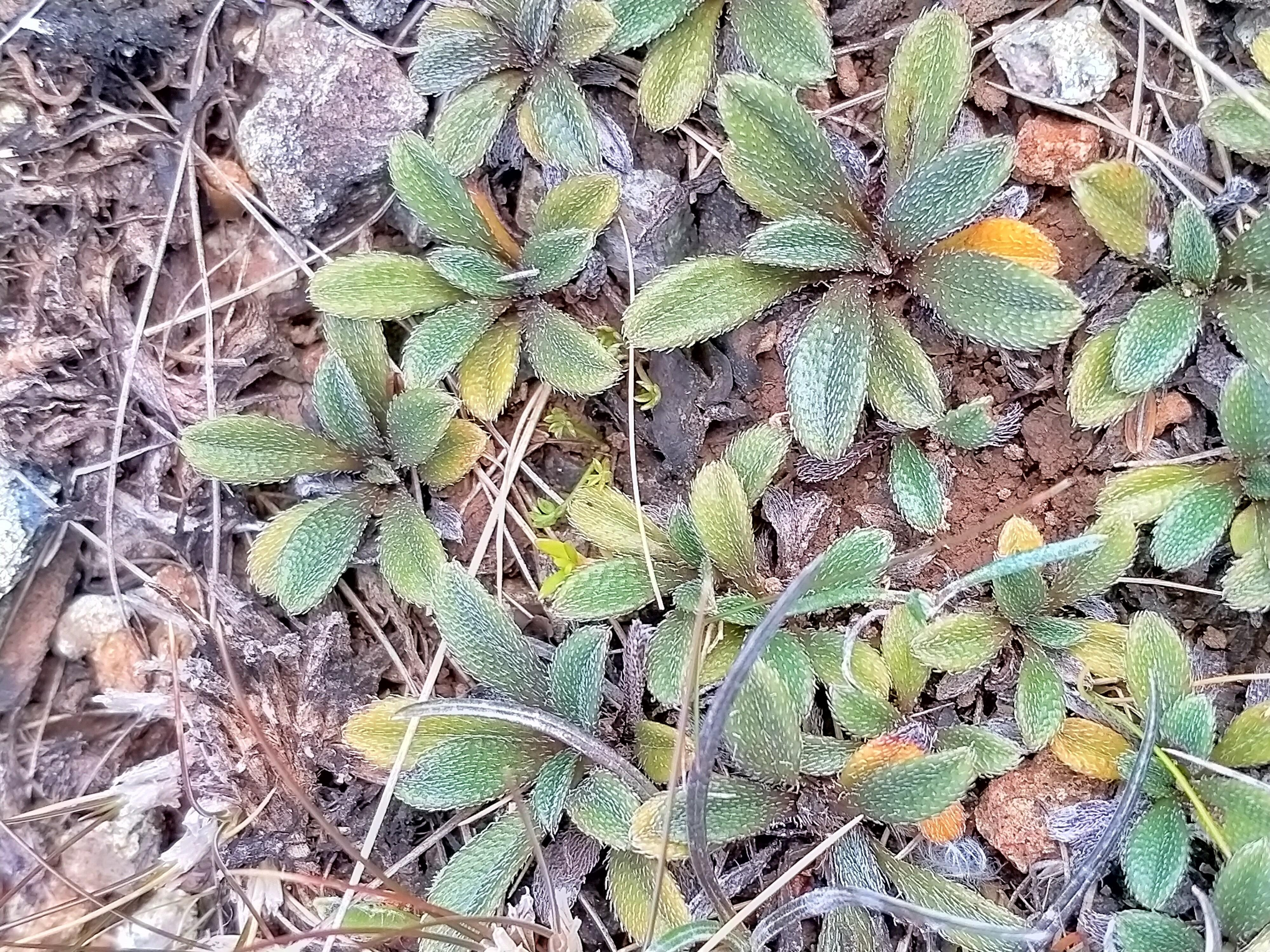
Rosette leaves

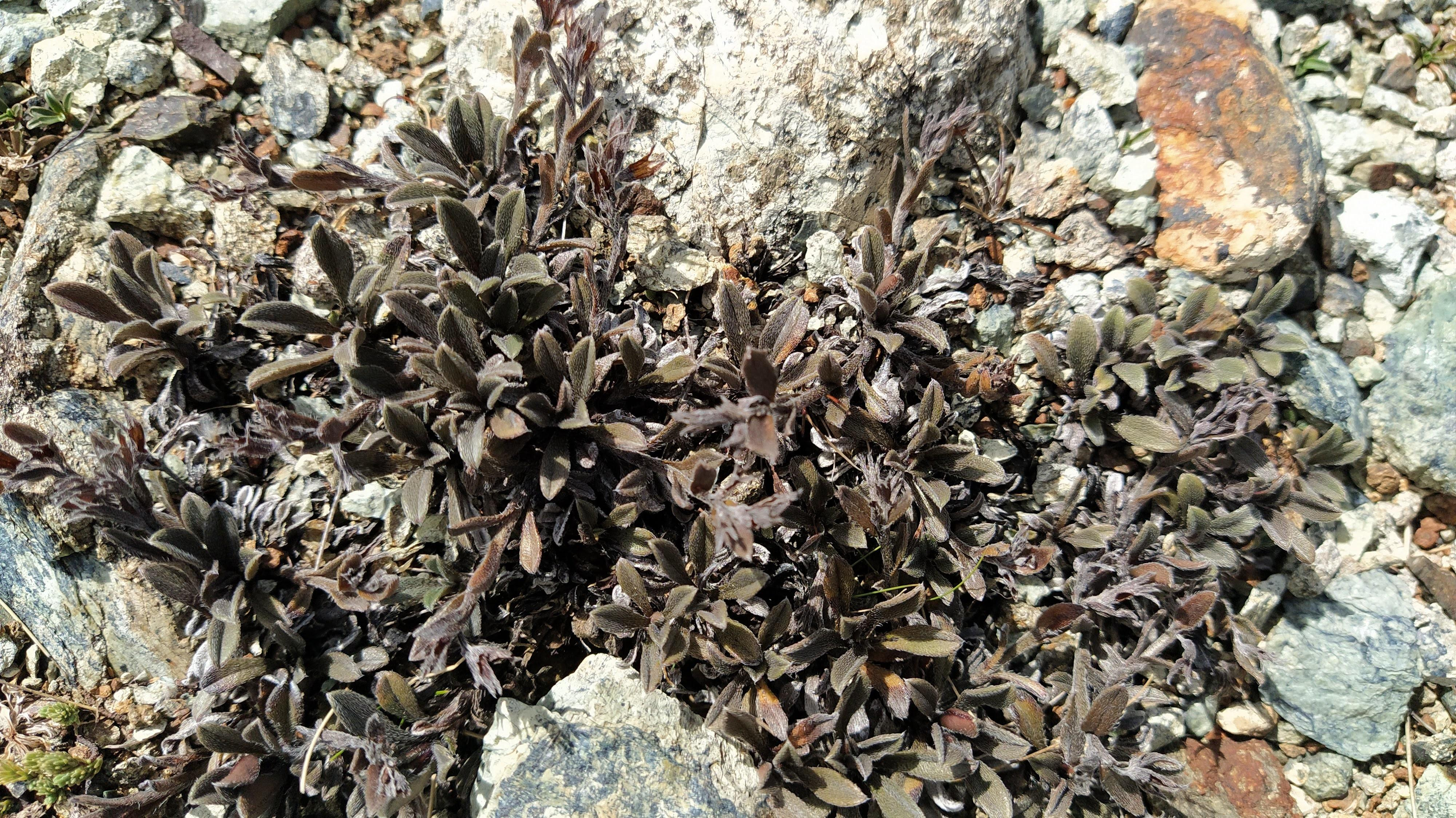
Habit
