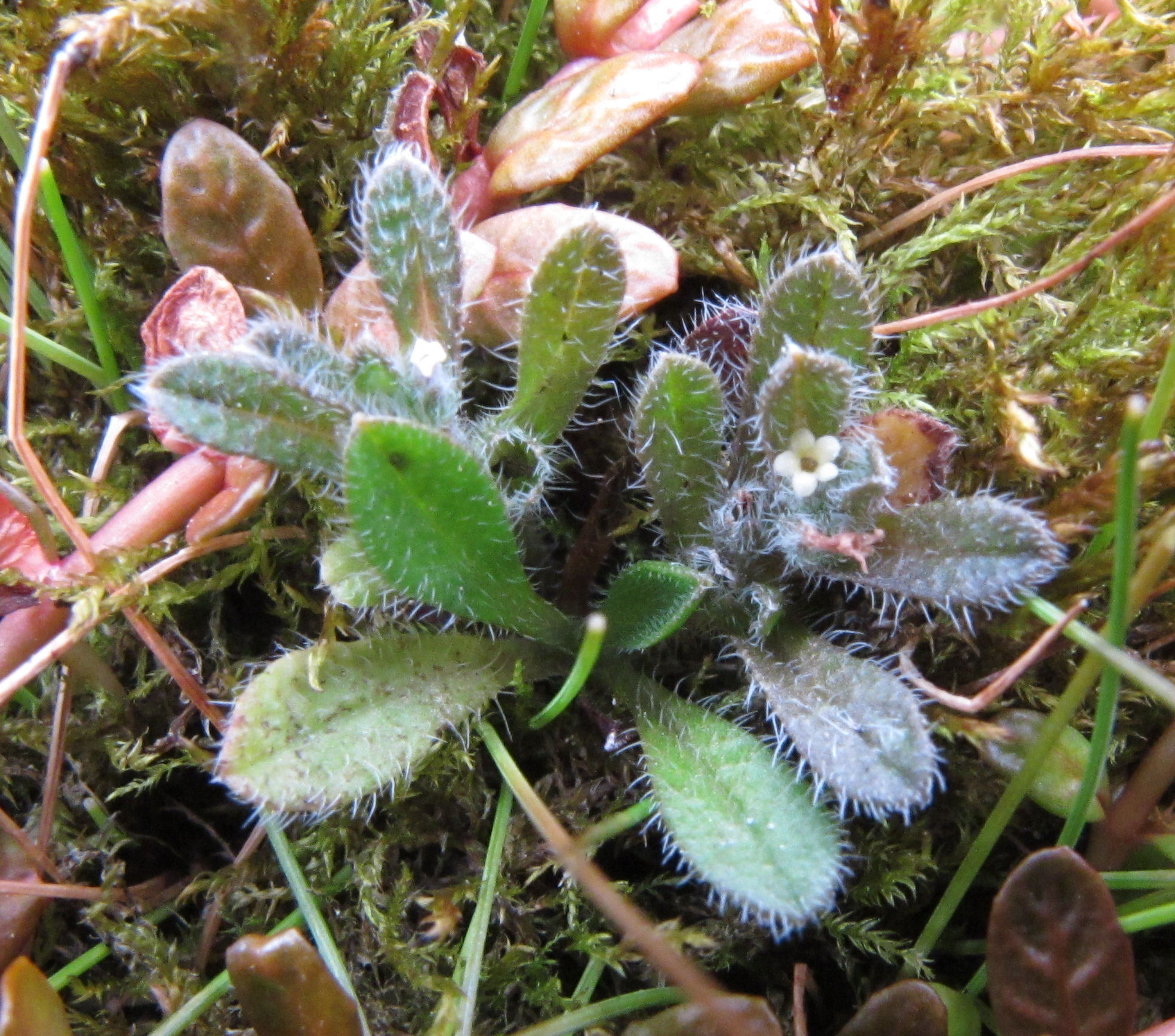
- Myosotis brevis plant, flowering

Conservation status
- Nationally Vulnerable (NZ TCS)

Scientific classification
- Kingdom: Plantae
- Clade: Tracheophytes
- Clade: Angiosperms
- Clade: Eudicots
- Clade: Asterids
- Order: Boraginales
- Family: Boraginaceae
- Genus: Myosotis
- Species: M. brevis

Binomial name
- Myosotis brevis de Lange & Barkla

Synonyms
- Myosotis pygmaea var. minutiflora G.Simpson & J.S.Thomson

= Myosotis brevis =

Species of flowering plant

Myosotis brevis is a species of flowering plant in the family Boraginaceae, endemic to New Zealand. George Simpson and J.S. Thomson described M. pygmaea var. minutiflora in 1942, and Peter de Lange and John Barkla recognized it at species rank in 2010, as M. brevis. Plants of this species of forget-me-not are small and annual, with a prostrate habit, bracteate inflorescences, tiny white corollas, and brown or green leaves.

== Taxonomy and etymology ==
Myosotis brevis de Lange & Barkla is in the plant family Boraginaceae, was originally described as M. pygmaea var. minutiflora in 1942 by George Simpson and J.S. Thomson, and was later recognized at species rank by Peter de Lange and John Barkla, as M. brevis, in 2010. The species required a new name since M. minutiflora Boiss. & Reut., an unrelated northern hemisphere species, was already published. The most recent taxonomic revision continues to recognize M. brevis at the species level, and it ss morphologically most similar to the other bracteate-prostrate species endemic to New Zealand in the pygmy subgroup, i.e. Myosotis glauca and M. antarctica. Myosotis brevis is the smallest New Zealand forget-me-not and differs from all other Myosotis in its small corolla (<2.0 mm diameter), short calyx (<1.7 mm at flowering), and small nutlets [0.9–1.2(–1.4) mm long by 0.5–0.8 mm wide].

The holotype specimen of Myosotis pygmaea var. minutiflora is lodged at the Allan Herbarium (CHR) of Manaaki Whenua - Landcare Research (CHR 75725). The specific epithet, brevis, is derived from Latin and means 'short', whereas minutiflora is also derived from Latin and means 'small flowered'.

== Description ==
Myosotis brevis plants are single rosettes. The rosette leaves have petioles 1–7 mm long. The rosette leaf blades are 1–9 mm long by 1–4 mm wide (length: width ratio 1.2–2.5: 1), narrowly oblanceolate to broadly obovate, widest at or above the middle, green or brown, with an obtuse (occasionally acute) apex. The upper surface of the leaf is densely covered in flexuous, appressed to erect, antrorse (forward-facing) hairs, whereas the lower surface of the leaf is similar but with fewer hairs (ranging from glabrous to with sparsely distributed hairs). Each rosette has multiple prostrate, bracteate inflorescences that are up to 5 cm long. The cauline leaves are similar in size and shape to the rosette leaves and become sessile toward the tip. Each inflorescence has up to 17 flowers, each borne on a very short pedicel, with a bract.

The calyx is 1–2 mm long at flowering and 2–4 mm long at fruiting, lobed to one-third or two-thirds its length, and hairs that are more densely distributed on the calyx ribs, and sometimes of two different lengths and types. The corolla is white or cream, or sometimes pale blue or blue-striped, up to 2 mm in diameter, with a cylindrical tube, and small yellow scales alternating with the petals. The anthers are very short (usually < 0.3 mm long) and fully included. The four smooth, shiny nutlets are usually 0.9–1.2 mm long by 0.5–0.8 mm wide and are ovoid in shape. M. brevis has M. discolor type pollen, which is distinctive amongst all bracteate-prostrate species in New Zealand. It flowers during the months September–April and fruits during the months October–April. Peak flowering and fruiting occurs October–December.

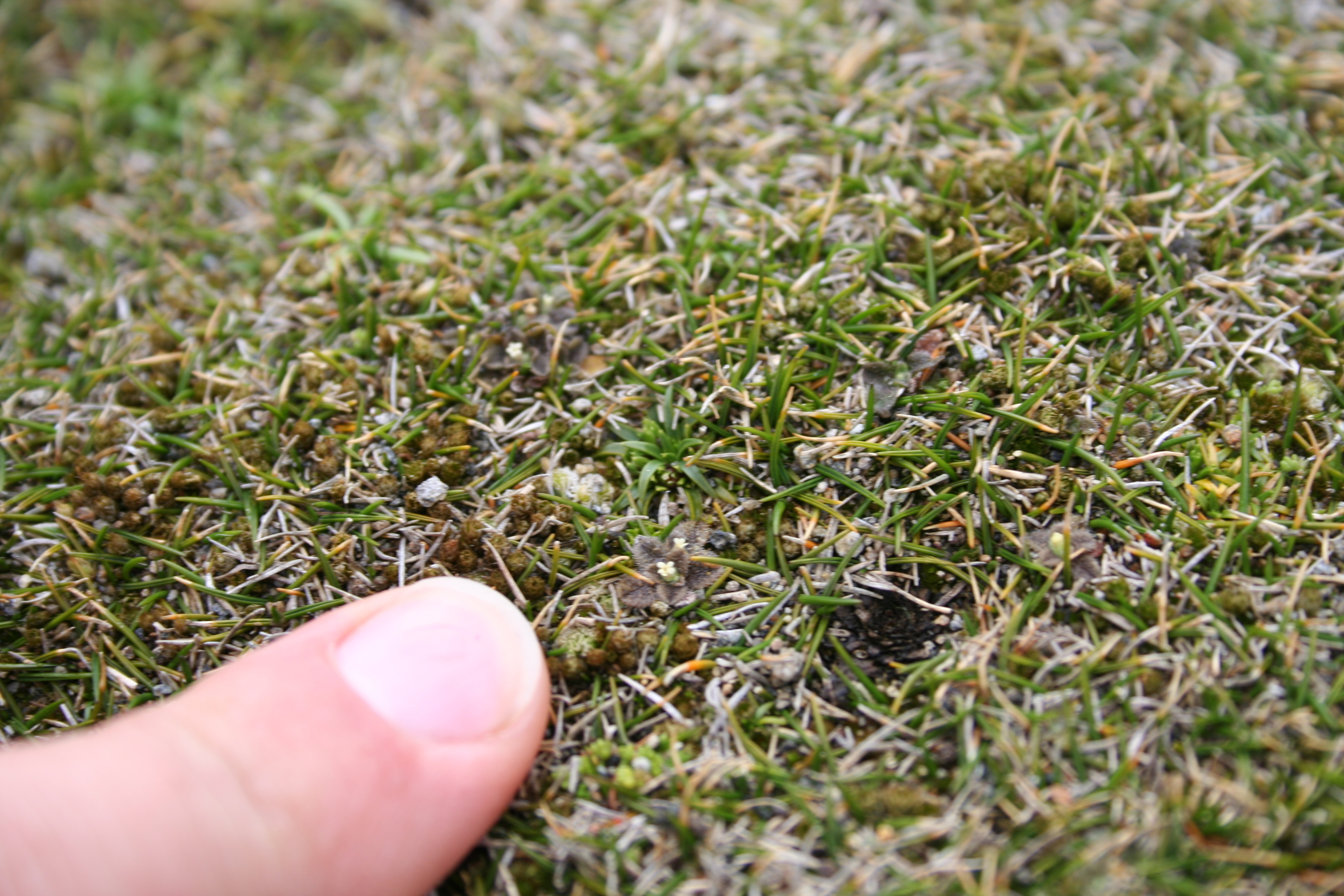
Flowering rosette

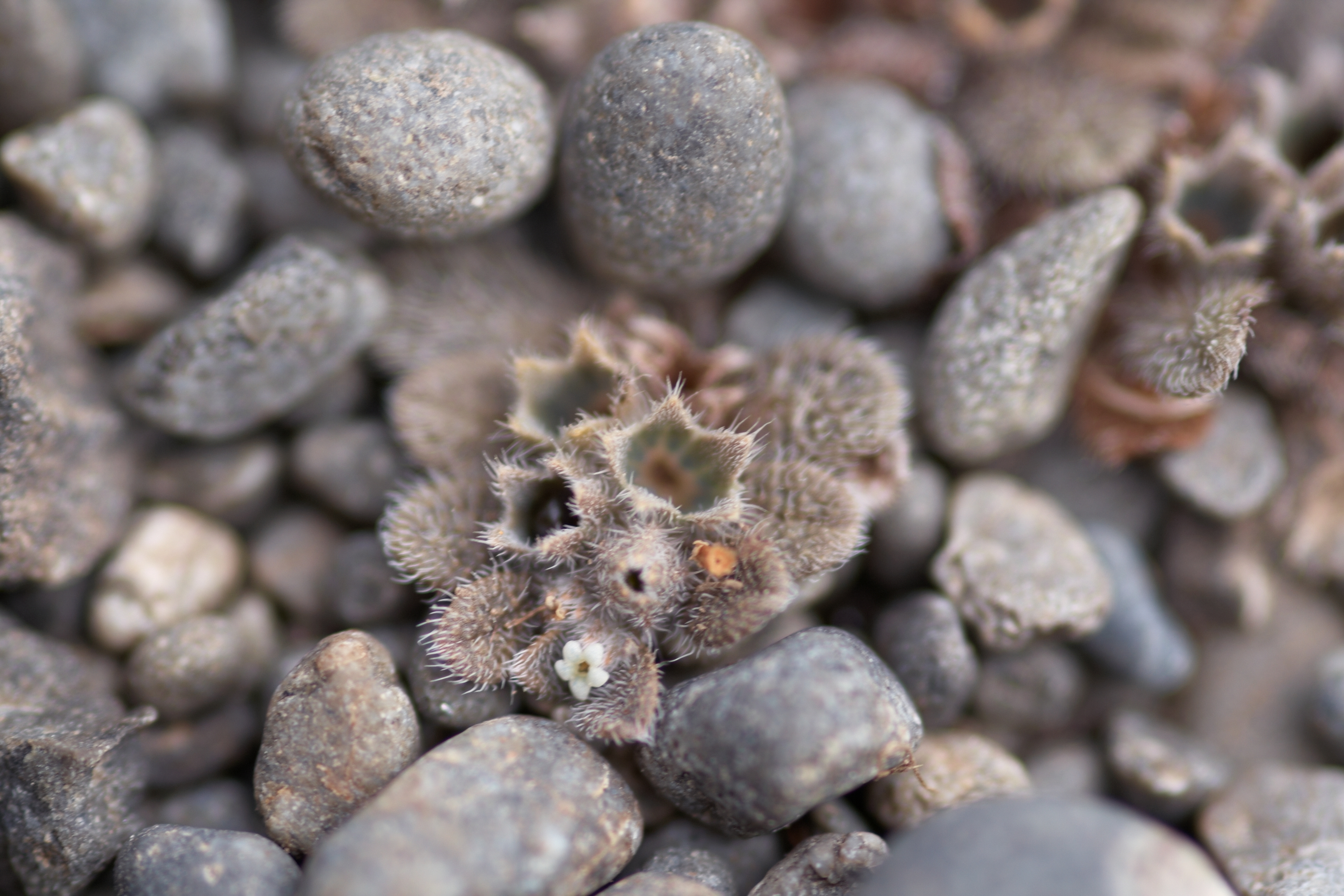
Fruiting and flowering plant

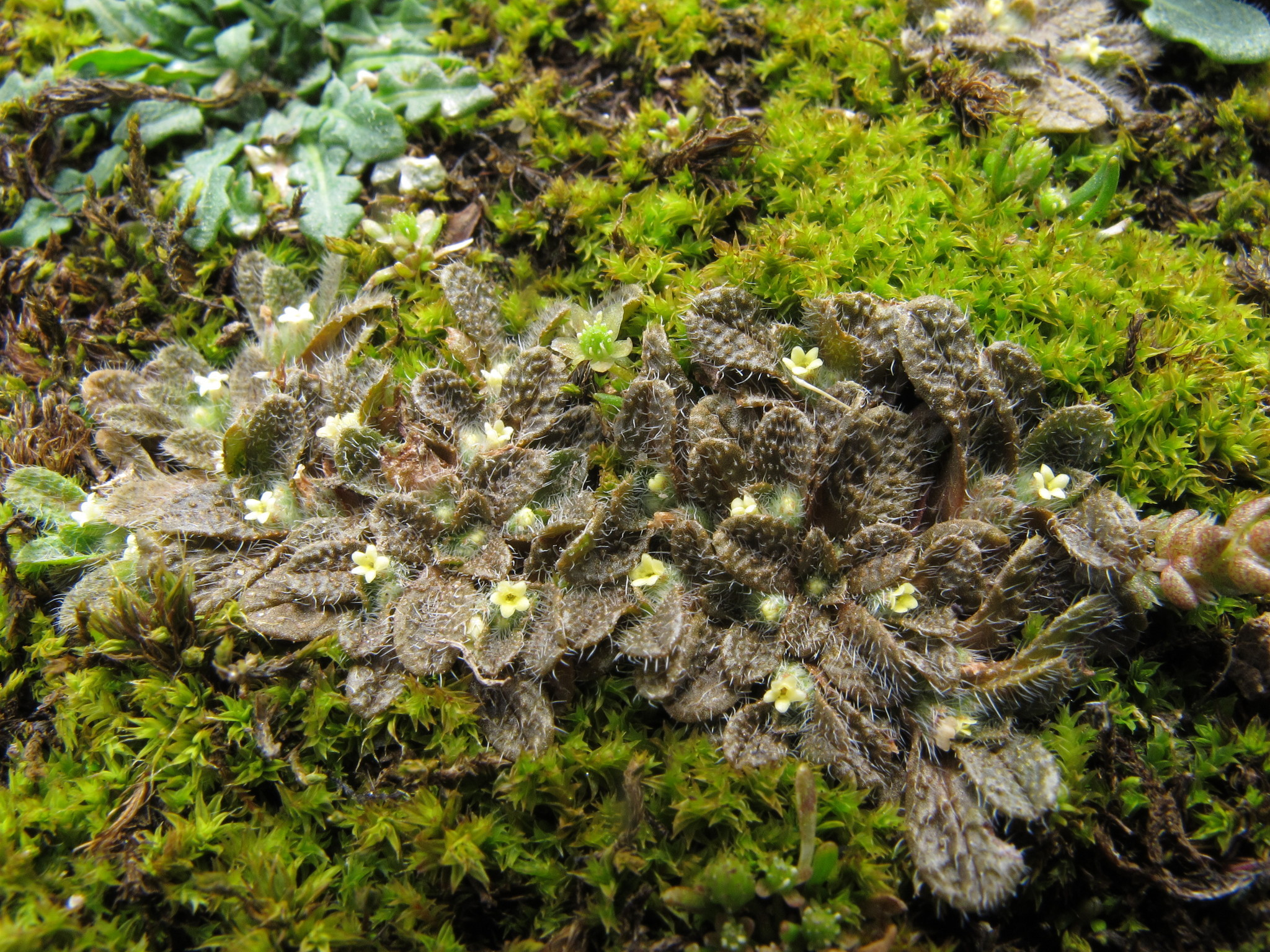
Growth habit

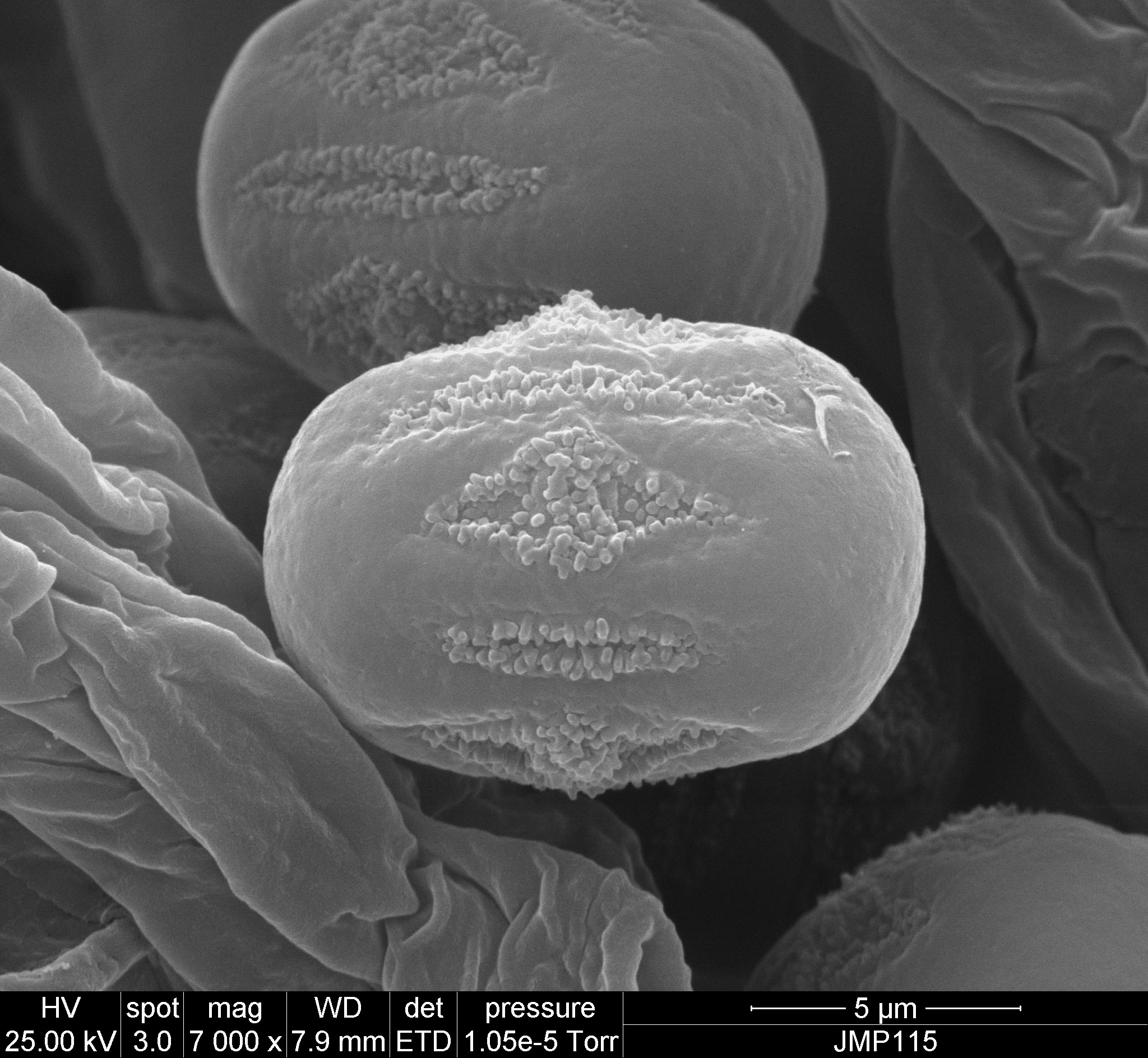
Pollen grain

== Phylogeny ==
Myosotis brevis was shown to be a part of the monophyletic southern hemisphere lineage of Myosotis in phylogenetic analyses of standard DNA sequencing markers (nuclear ribosomal DNA and chloroplast DNA regions). Within the southern hemisphere lineage, species relationships were not well resolved. The two sequenced individuals of M. brevis had very similar sequences and grouped near one another in all analyses. In a study analyzing microsatellite markers developed specifically for the pygmy subgroup of southern hemisphere Myosotis, all (or most) populations of M. brevis cluster together in the different analyses.

== Distribution and habitat ==
Myosotis brevis is a forget-me-not endemic to coastal areas in the North Island (Taranaki, Southern North Island) and mountainous areas of Canterbury and Otago of the South Island of New Zealand, from 0–1900 m ASL. M. brevis is found in herb fields, turfs and gravels of coastal cliffs, platforms and beaches on the North Island; at the edges of seasonally inundated tarn edges in Canterbury; and in exposed, dry to seasonally moist alpine fellfield, pasture or turf in Otago.

== Conservation status ==
The species is listed as "Threatened - Nationally Vulnerable" on the most recent assessment (2017-2018) under the New Zealand Threatened Classification system for plants, with the qualifiers "EF" (Extreme Fluctuations) and "Sp" (Sparse). A recent taxonomic revision recommended maintaining this conservation status and qualifiers.
