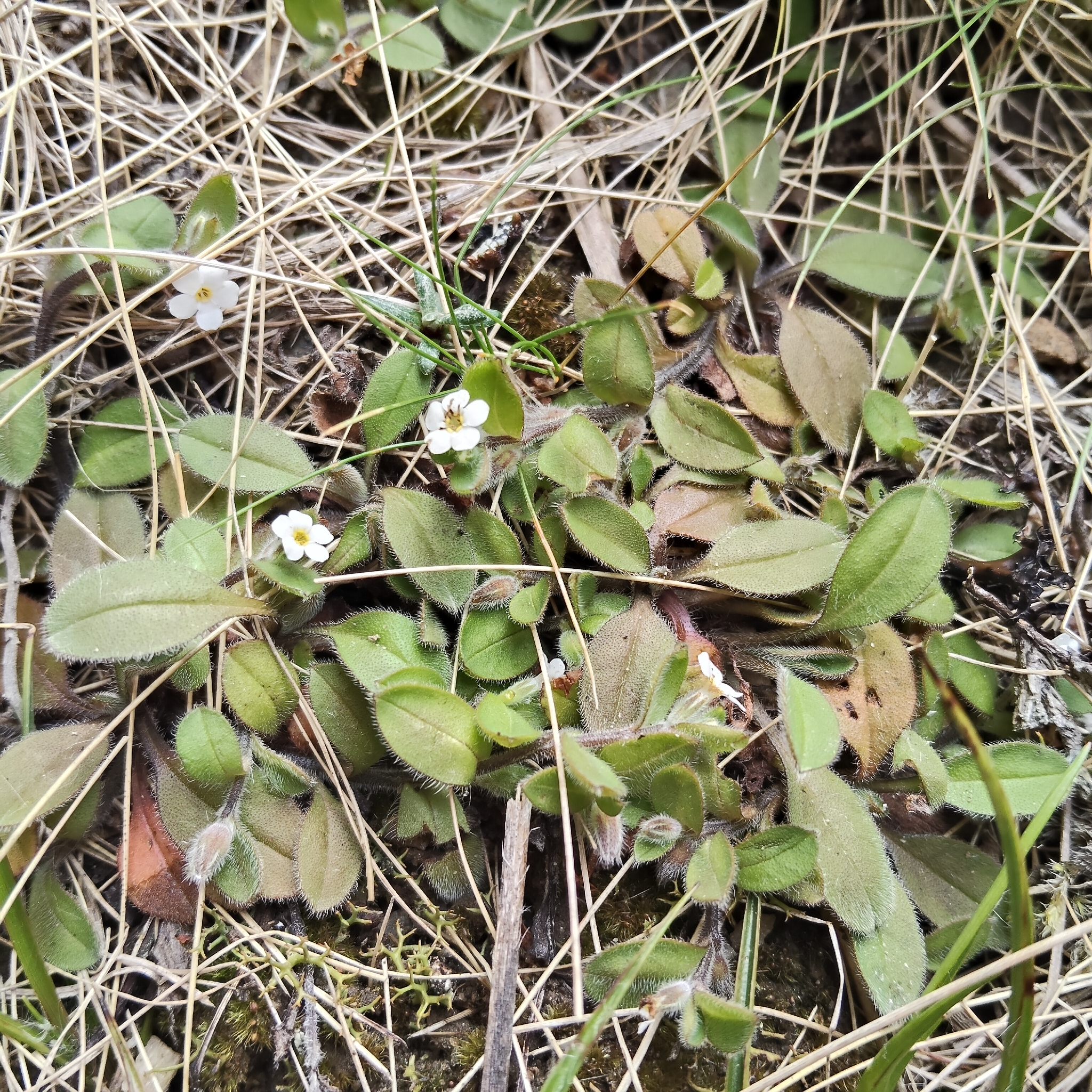
- Myosotis umbrosa in flower in the Rock and Pillar Range, Otago, New Zealand observed in January 2026

Conservation status
- Nationally Critical (NZ TCS)

Scientific classification
- Kingdom: Plantae
- Clade: Tracheophytes
- Clade: Angiosperms
- Clade: Eudicots
- Clade: Asterids
- Order: Boraginales
- Family: Boraginaceae
- Genus: Myosotis
- Species: M. umbrosa

Binomial name
- Myosotis umbrosa Meudt, Prebble and Thorsen

= Myosotis umbrosa =

Species of flowering plant

Myosotis umbrosa is a species of flowering plant in the family Boraginaceae, endemic to the South Island of New Zealand. Heidi Meudt, Jessica Prebble and Michael Thorsen described the species. Plants of this species of forget-me-not are perennial with a prostrate habit, bracteate inflorescences, and white corollas.

== Description ==
Myosotis umbrosa plants are single rosettes. The rosette leaves are 4–14 per plant, and have petioles 6–25 mm long. The rosette leaf blades are 6–31 mm long by 4–10 mm wide (length: width ratio 1.7–3.2: 1), widest at or above the middle, usually oblanceolate to narrowly obovate, with an obtuse apex. The upper surface of the leaf is sparsely to densely covered in flexuous, patent to erect, antrorse (forward-facing) hairs that are oriented at an angle relative to the mid vein. The lower surface of the leaf is sparsely to densely covered in flexuous, patent to erect, retrorse (backward-facing) hairs, that are also angled relative to the mid vein. Each rosette has 2–7 prostrate, unbranched, bracteate inflorescences that are 11–110 mm long. The cauline leaves are similar in size, shape and hairs to the rosette leaves, but smaller and becoming sessile toward the tips of the inflorescences. There can be up to 13 flowers in each inflorescence, each one borne on a short pedicel and with a cauline leaf. The calyx is 2–3 mm long at flowering and 3–5 mm long at fruiting, lobed to about half of its length, and densely covered in long, flexuous, patent to erect antrorse hairs, with some hooked hairs and some retrorse hairs near the calyx base. The corolla is white and up to 5 mm in diameter, with a cylindrical tube, petals that are broadly to very broadly obovate and flat, and small yellow scales alternating with the petals. The anthers are fully included, or rarely partially exserted with the tips just reaching or surpassing the scales. The four smooth, shiny, light to dark brown nutlets are 1.6–1.7 mm long by 1.2–1.3 mm wide and ovoid to broadly ovoid in shape.

Myosotis umbrosa has M. australis type pollen with 8, 10 or 12 apertures.

The chromosome number of M. umbrosa is unknown.

It flowers and fruits mainly from December to February.

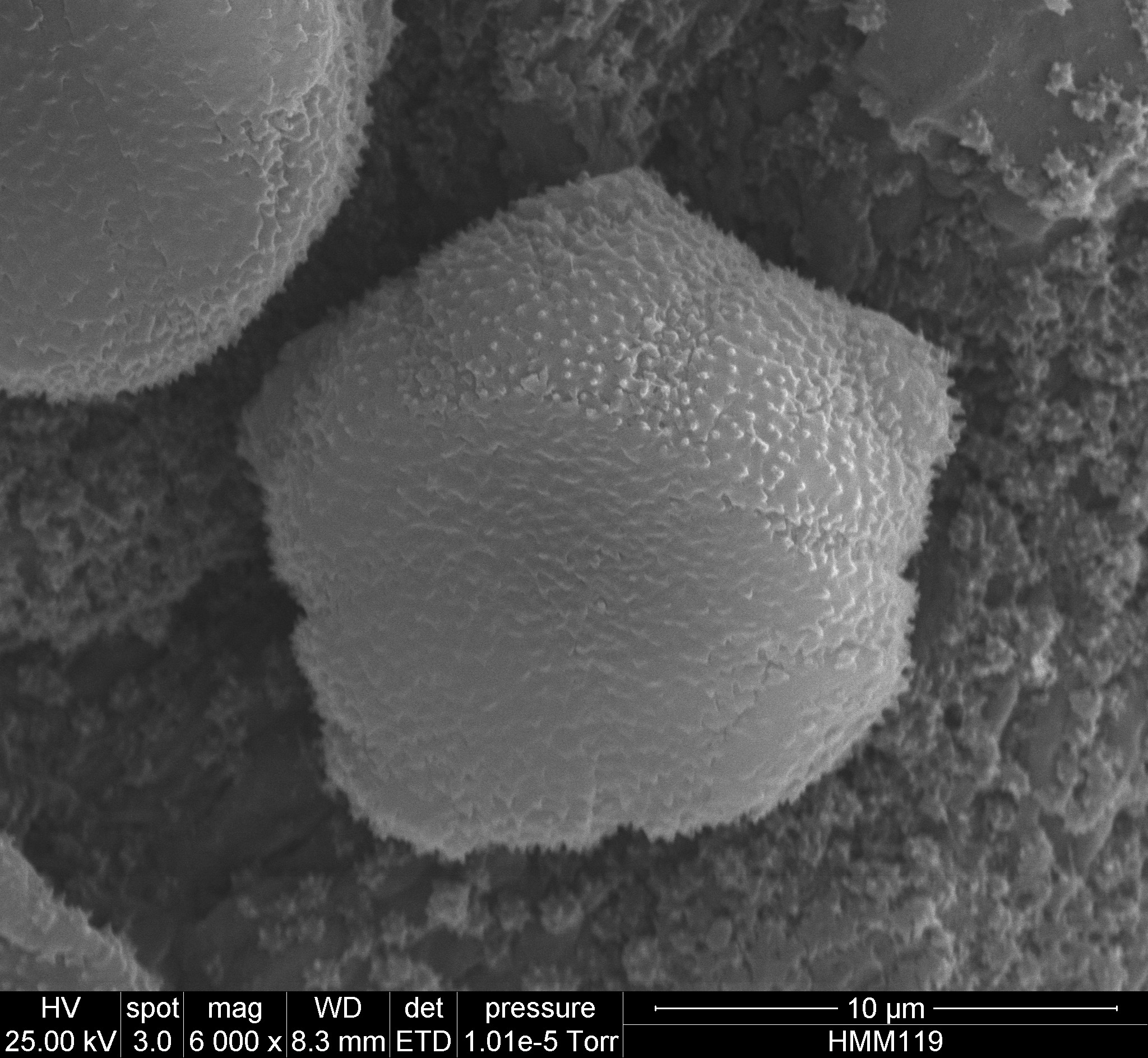
Pollen

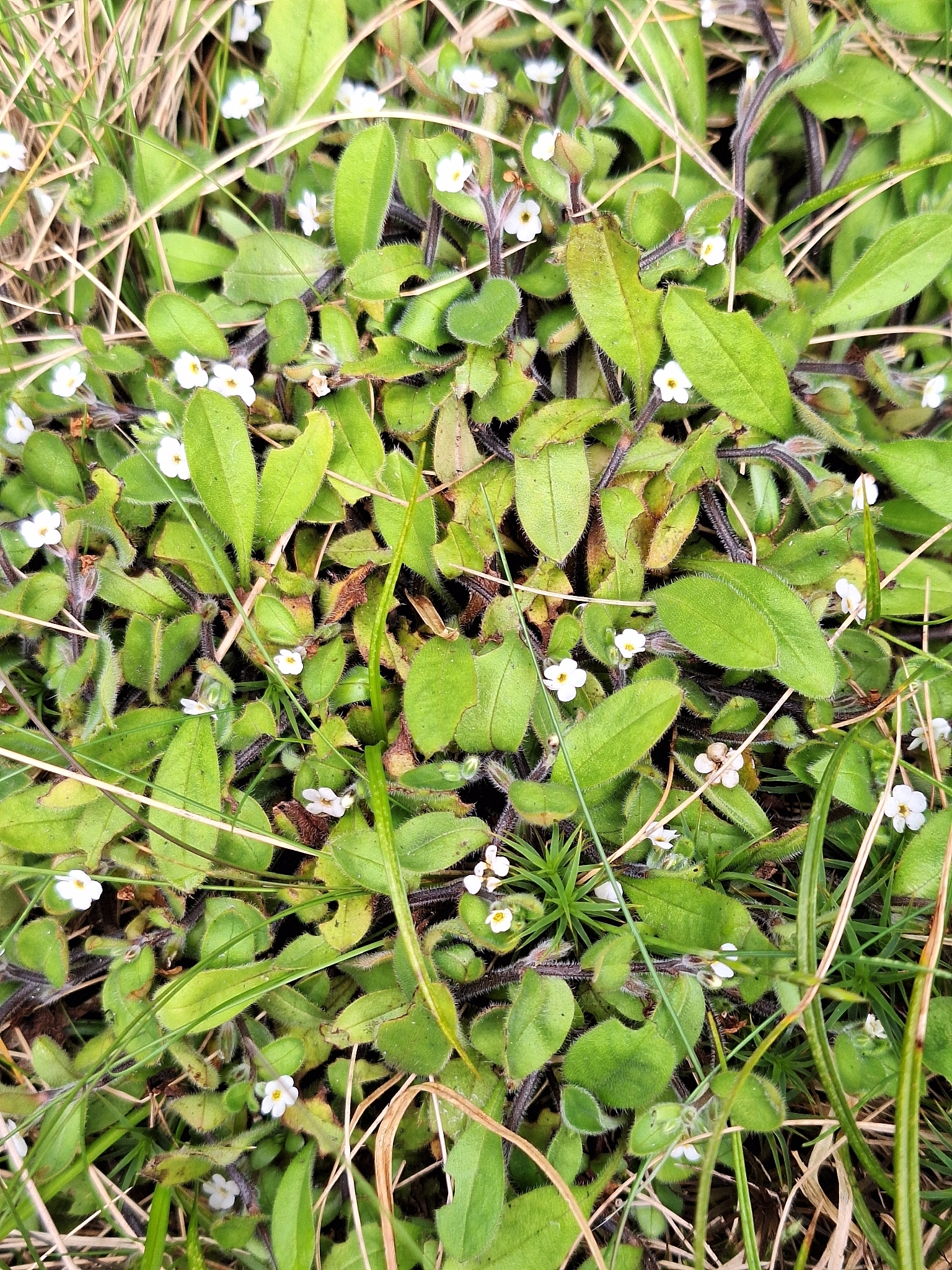
Habit

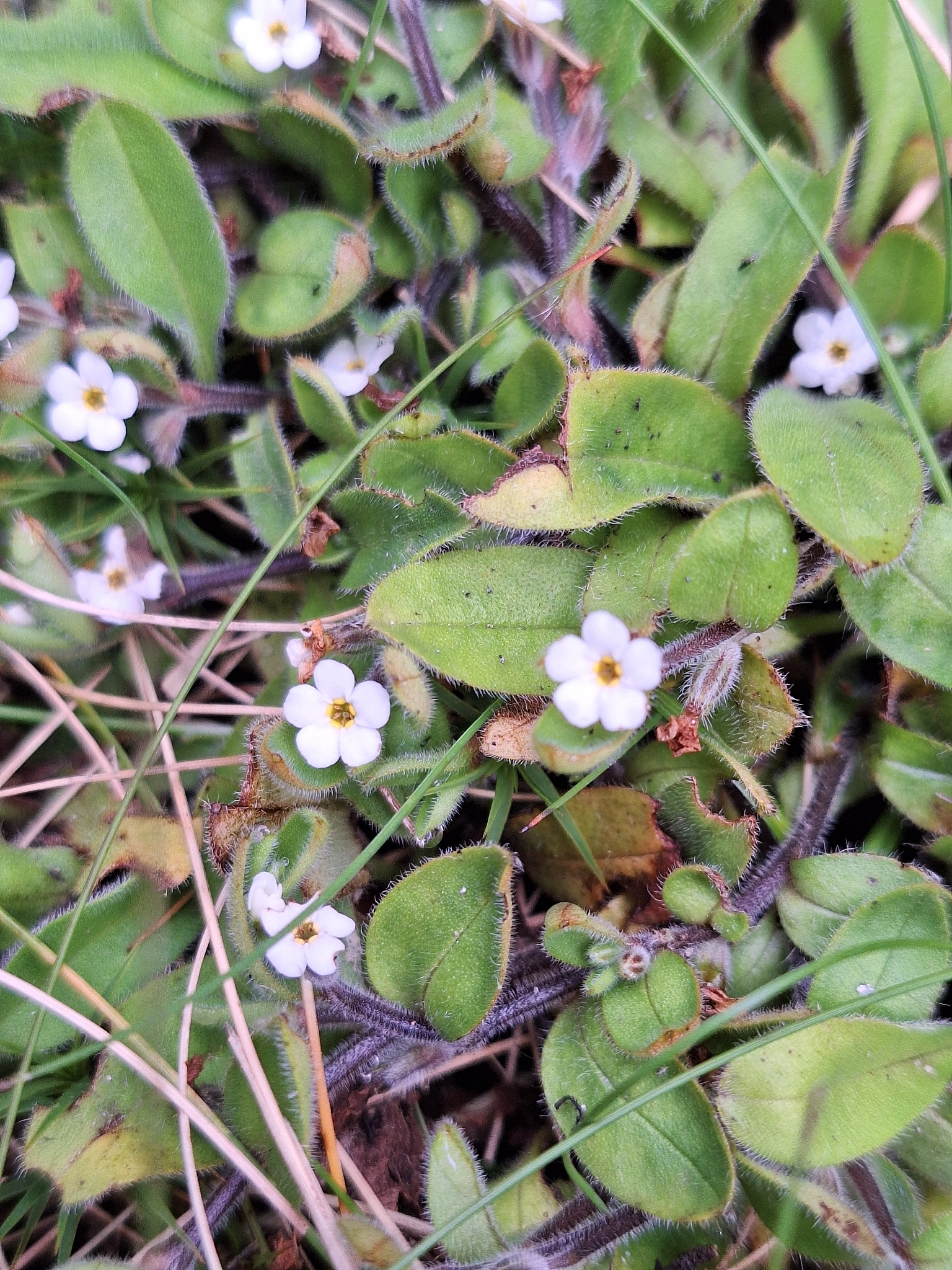
Flowers

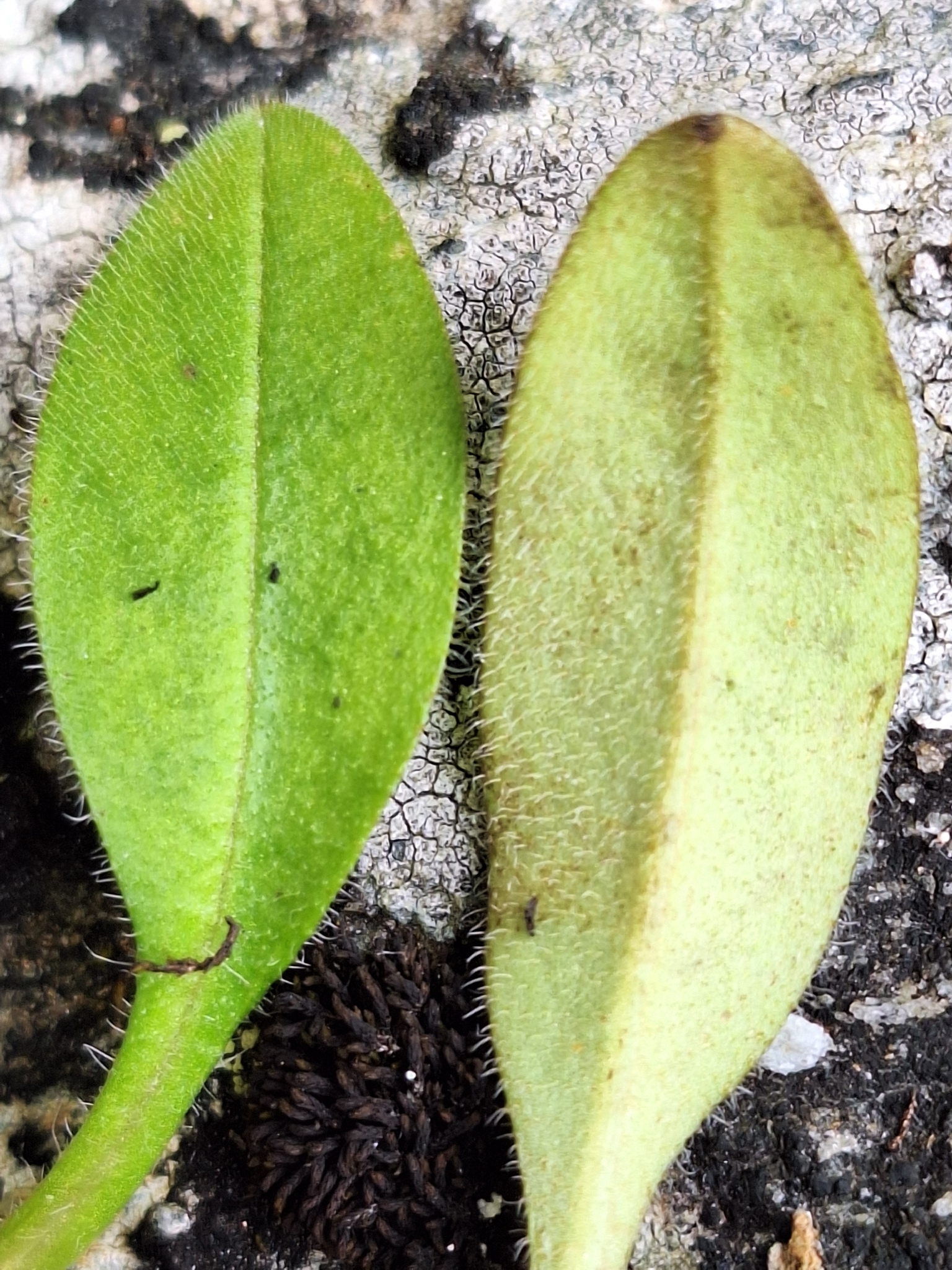
Close up of upper and lower rosette leaf surface

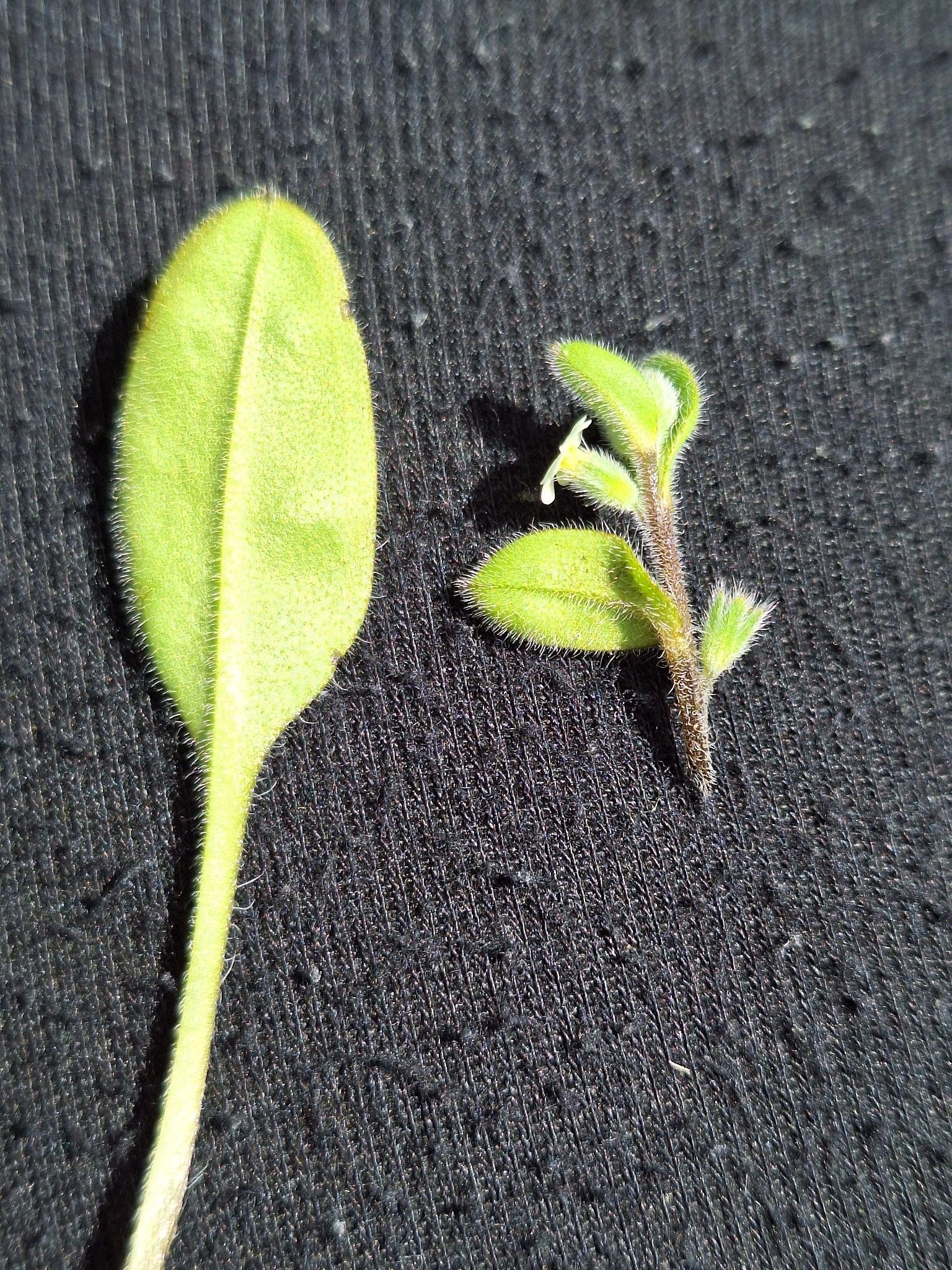
Close up of lower rosette leaf surface and tip of flowering branch

== Distribution and habitat ==
Myosotis umbrosa is endemic to the South Island of New Zealand in Otago, known only from the Rock and Pillar and Lammerlaw Ranges, from 915–1370 m elevation. It is found in shady, rocky areas often at the base of tors.

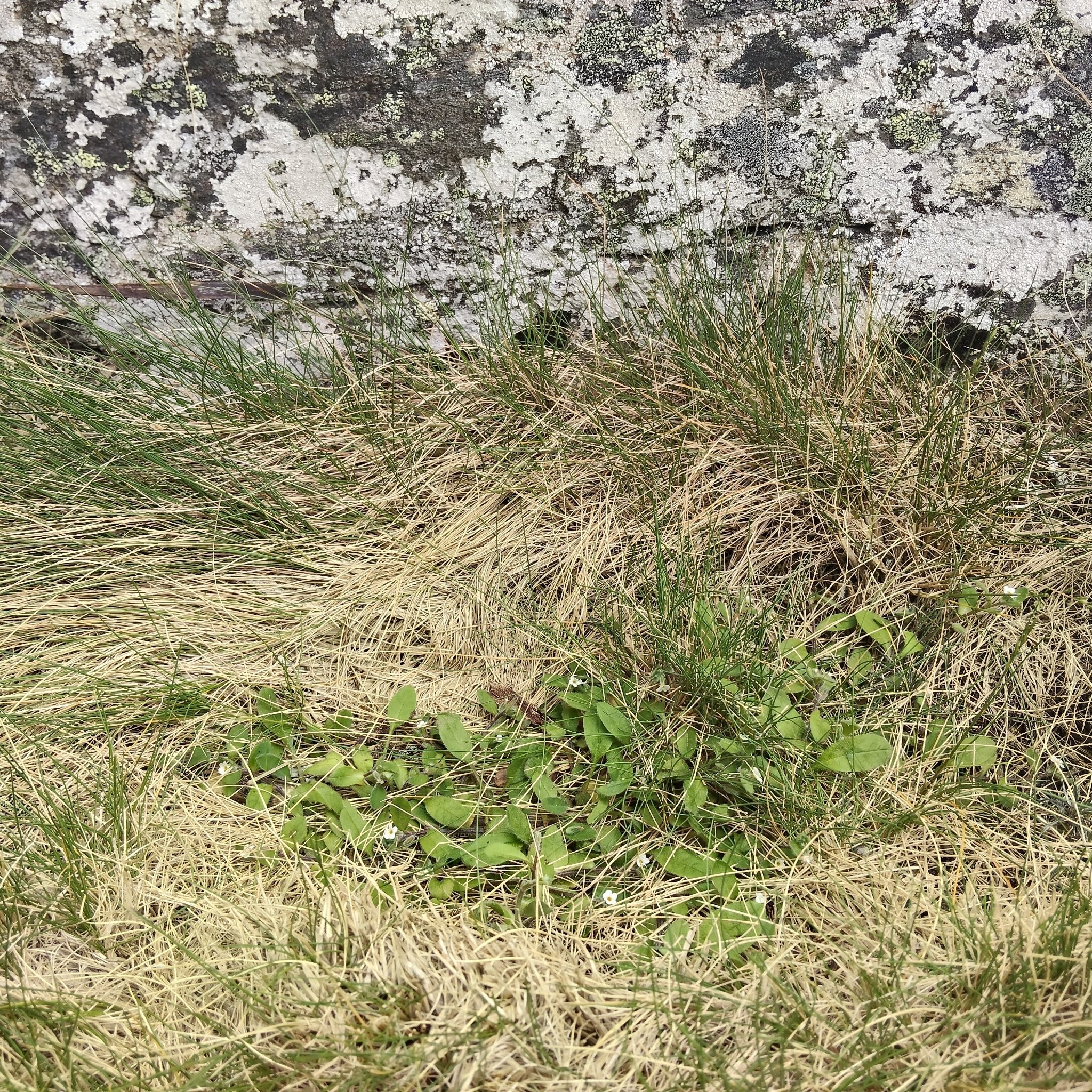
Flowering plant at the base of a rock tor in the Rock and Pillar Range

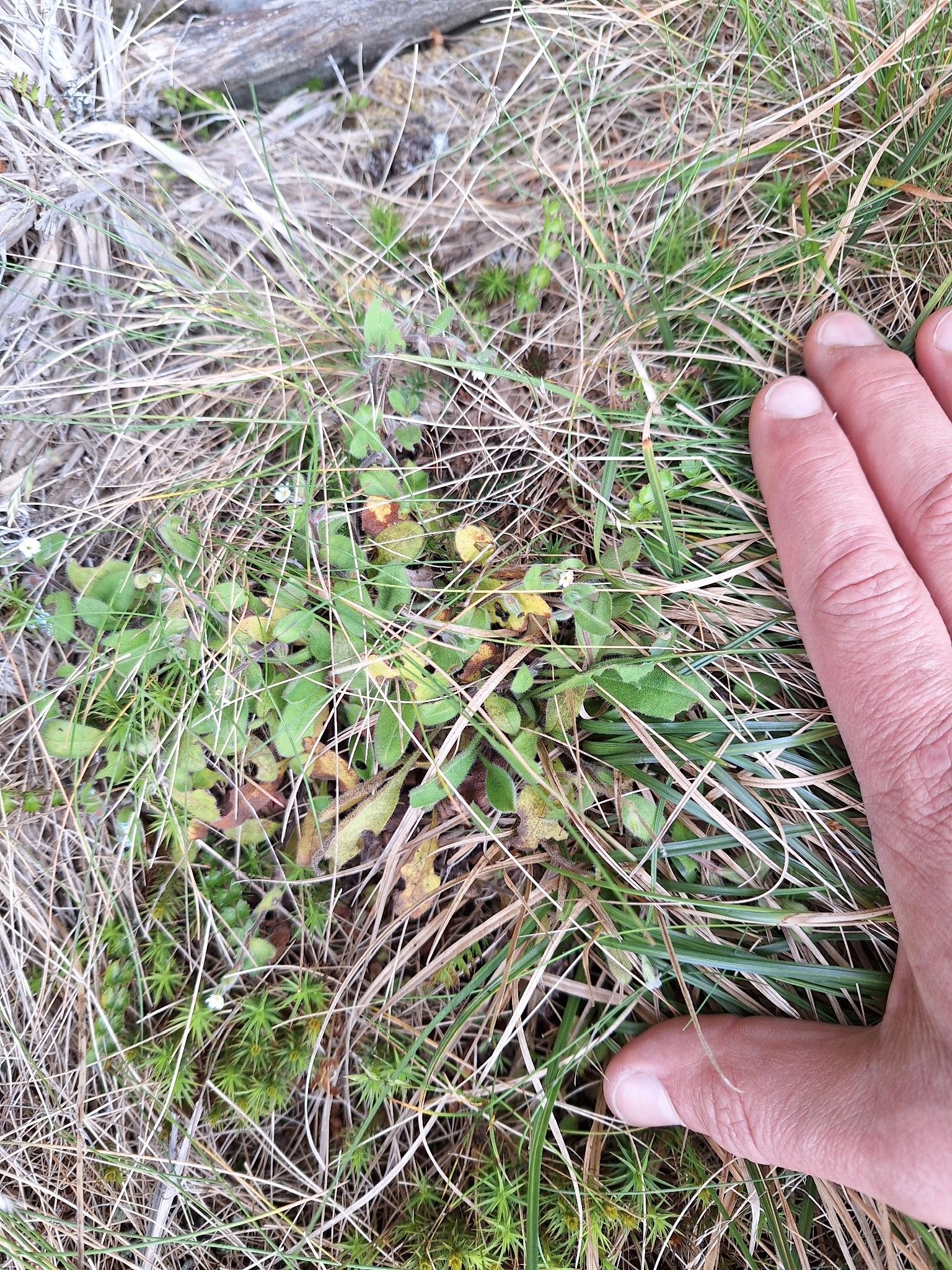
Flowering individual amongst grasses and moss in its natural habitat

== Taxonomy and etymology ==
Myosotis umbrosa Meudt et al. is in the plant family Boraginaceae and was originally described in 2018 by Heid Meudt, Jessica Prebble and Michael Thorsen. It is morphologically most similar to M. antarctica and M. lyallii, but can be distinguished from them and other bracteate-prostrate species of Myosotis by a combination of retrorse (backward facing) hairs on the underside of the leaf, hooked hairs and retrorse hairs on the base of the calyx, and flowers sometimes slightly below cauline leaf axils.

The type specimen of Myosotis umbrosa is lodged at the herbarium (WELT) of the Museum of New Zealand, Te Papa Tongarewa.

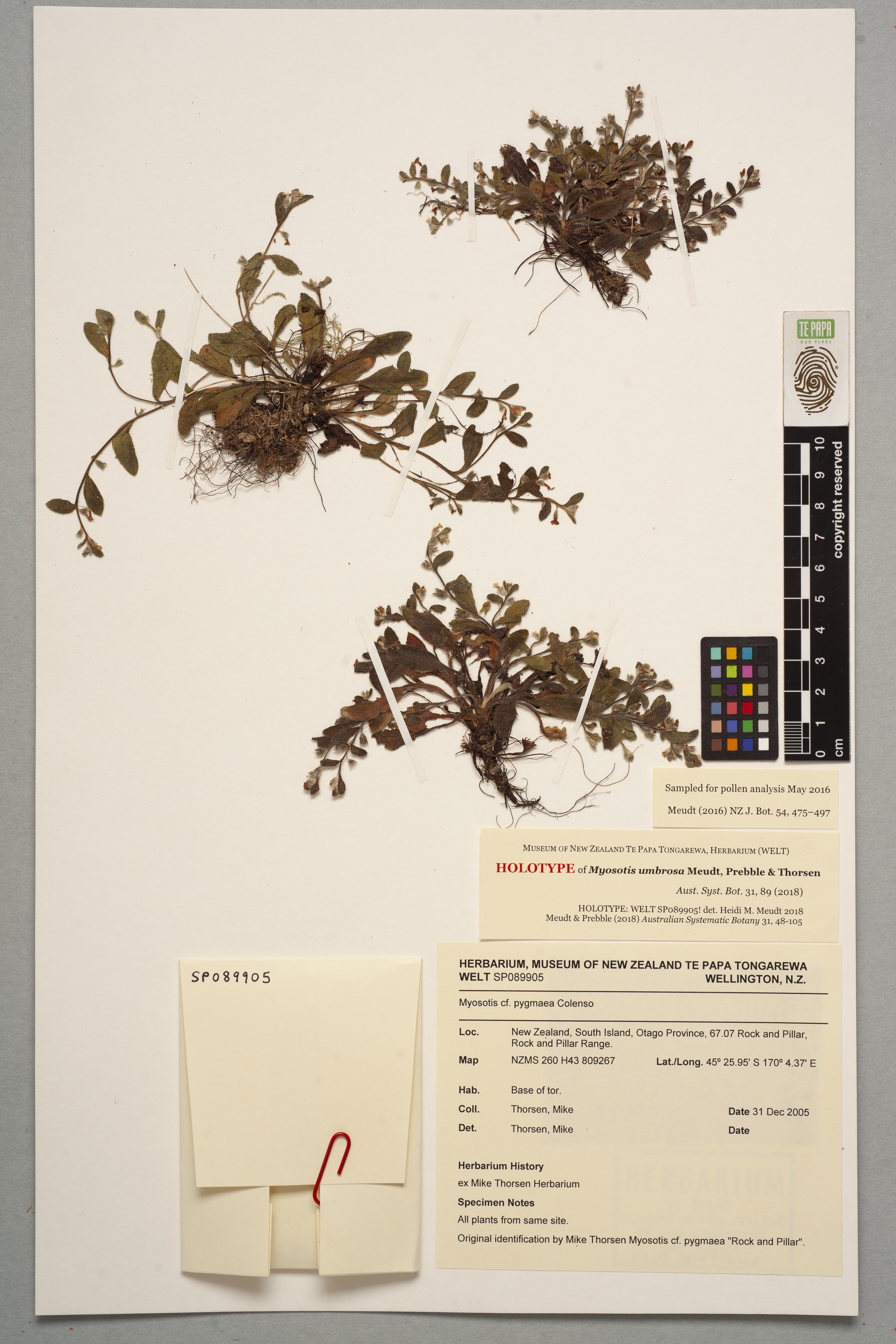
Holotype of Myosotis umbrosa at Te Papa

The specific epithet, umbrosa, is derived from the Latin word umbra (shadow, shade) and is a nod to its shady habitat near rock tors.

== Phylogeny ==
Myosotis umbrosa was not included in phylogenetic analyses of standard DNA sequencing markers (nuclear ribosomal DNA and chloroplast DNA regions).

A 2025 phylogenomic study based on DNA from whole plastids, target capture of universal angiosperm bait markers, and the full nuclear ribosomal DNA cistron, included two or three individuals of M. umbrosa. In that study, M. umbrosa was not always monophyletic in the different data sets, which provided no clear pattern as to its closest relatives.

== Conservation status ==
The species is listed as Threatened – Nationally Critical in the most recent assessment (2023) of the New Zealand Threatened Classification for plants, a status which was unchanged from the previous assessment. It also has the qualifiers "DPS" (Data Poor: Size), "DPT" (Data Poor: Trend), "RR" (Range Restricted), and "Sp" (Sparse).
