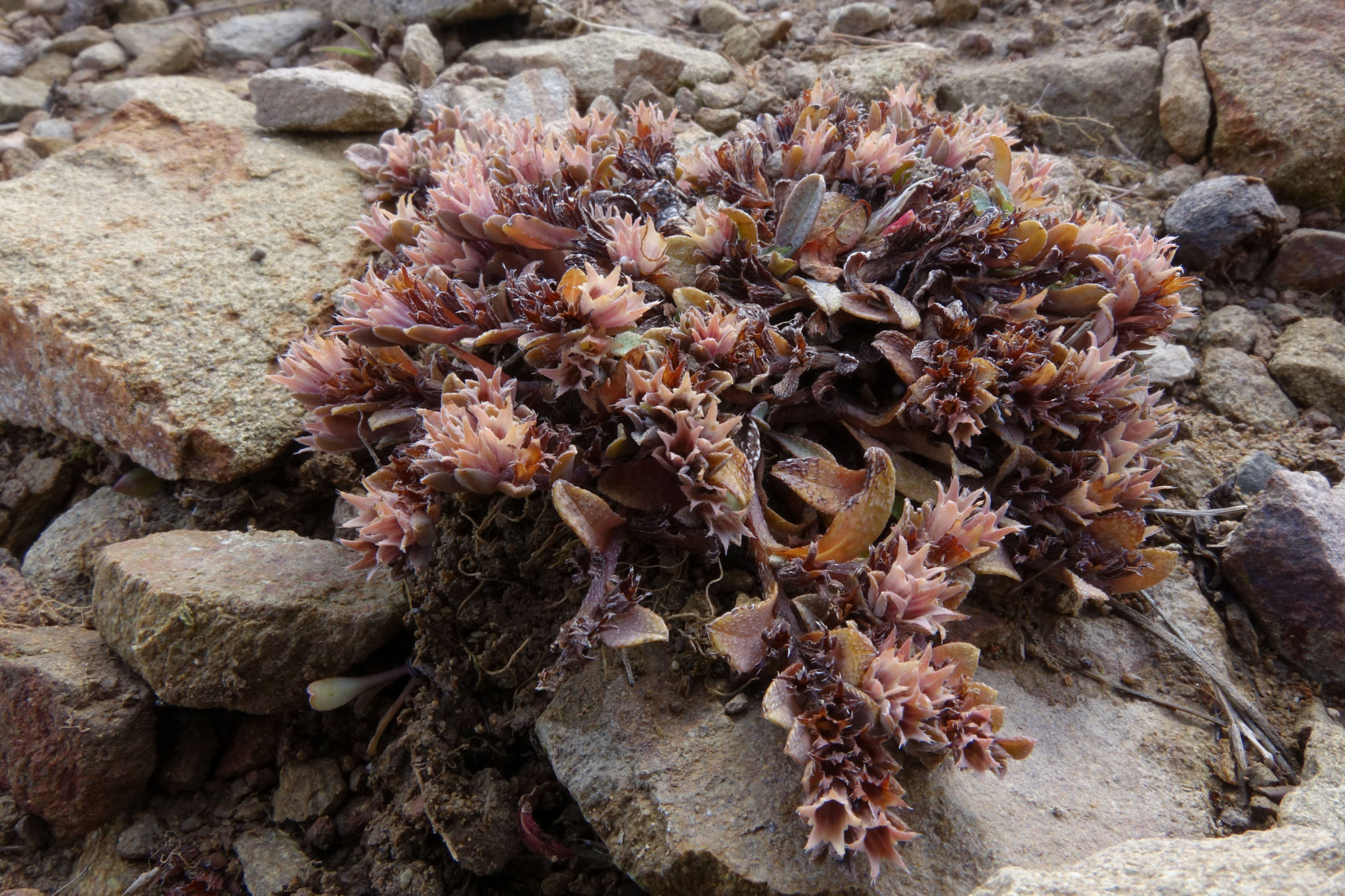
- Myosotis glauca plant, fruiting

Conservation status
- Nationally Vulnerable (NZ TCS)

Scientific classification
- Kingdom: Plantae
- Clade: Tracheophytes
- Clade: Angiosperms
- Clade: Eudicots
- Clade: Asterids
- Order: Boraginales
- Family: Boraginaceae
- Genus: Myosotis
- Species: M. glauca

Binomial name
- Myosotis glauca G.Simpson & J.S.Thomson) de Lange & Barkla

Synonyms
- Myosotis pygmaea var. glauca G.Simpson & J.S.Thomson

= Myosotis glauca =

Species of flowering plant

Myosotis glauca is a species of flowering plant in the family Boraginaceae, endemic to the South Island of New Zealand. George Simpson and J.S. Thomson described M. pygmaea var. glauca in 1942, and Peter de Lange and John Barkla recognized it at species rank in 2010. Plants of this species of forget-me-not are perennial with a prostrate habit, bracteate inflorescences, white corollas, and often glaucous grey leaves.

== Taxonomy and etymology ==
Myosotis glauca (G.Simpson & J.S.Thomson) de Lange & Barkla is in the plant family Boraginaceae, was originally described as M. pygmaea var. glauca in 1942 by George Simpson and J.S. Thomson, and was later recognized at species rank by Peter de Lange and John Barkla in 2010. In the most recent taxonomic revision, it is continued to be recognized at the species level, and is morphologically most similar to the other bracteate-prostrate species endemic to New Zealand in the pygmy subgroup, i.e. Myosotis brevis and M. antarctica. Myosotis glauca differs from these two species in its straight, appressed trichomes and (usually) glaucous grey leaves.

The lectotype specimen of Myosotis glauca was designated by Lucy Moore and is lodged at the Allan Herbarium (CHR) of Manaaki Whenua – Landcare Research (CHR 75722). There is an isolectotype at the Auckland War Memorial Museum (AK 210591).

The specific epithet, glauca, is derived from Latin and refers to the dull greyish-green glaucous leaves of species.

== Phylogeny ==
Myosotis glauca was shown to be a part of the monophyletic southern hemisphere lineage of Myosotis in phylogenetic analyses of standard DNA sequencing markers (nuclear ribosomal DNA and chloroplast DNA regions). Within the southern hemisphere lineage, species relationships were not well resolved. The one sequenced individual of M. glauca usually grouped with another pygmy subgroup species, M. antarctica (including M. drucei), as well as with the cushion species, M. uniflora, among other species. In a study analyzing microsatellite markers developed specifically for the pygmy subgroup of southern hemisphere Myosotis, all populations of M. glauca cluster together in the different analyses.

== Description ==
Myosotis glauca plants are single rosettes. The rosette leaves have petioles 2–9 mm long. The rosette leaf blades are 4–17 mm long by 2–7 mm wide (length: width ratio 1.3–3.5: 1), narrowly oblanceolate to broadly obovate, widest at or above the middle, dull greyish-green (glaucous) or sometimes bright green, with an obtuse apex. The upper surface of the leaf is sparsely covered in straight, appressed to patent, antrorse (forward-facing) hairs, whereas the lower surface of the leaf is usually glabrous or with sparsely distributed hairs on the mid vein only. Each rosette has multiple prostrate, bracteate inflorescences that are up to 12 cm long. The cauline leaves are similar to the rosette leaves but decrease in size and become sessile toward the tip. Each inflorescence has up to 19 flowers, each borne on a short pedicel, with a bract. The calyx is 2–3 mm long at flowering and 3–8 mm long at fruiting, lobed to a quarter or half its length, and usually with hairs only along the calyx ribs. The corolla is white, up to 4 mm in diameter, with a cylindrical tube, and small yellow scales alternating with the petals. The anthers are fully included. The four smooth, shiny, nutlets are usually 1.2–1.5 mm long by 0.8–1.2 mm wide and are ovoid in shape.

The chromosome number of M. glauca is unknown.

M. glauca has M. australis type pollen.

It flowers during the months September–March and fruits October–April, with the main flowering and fruiting period December–January.

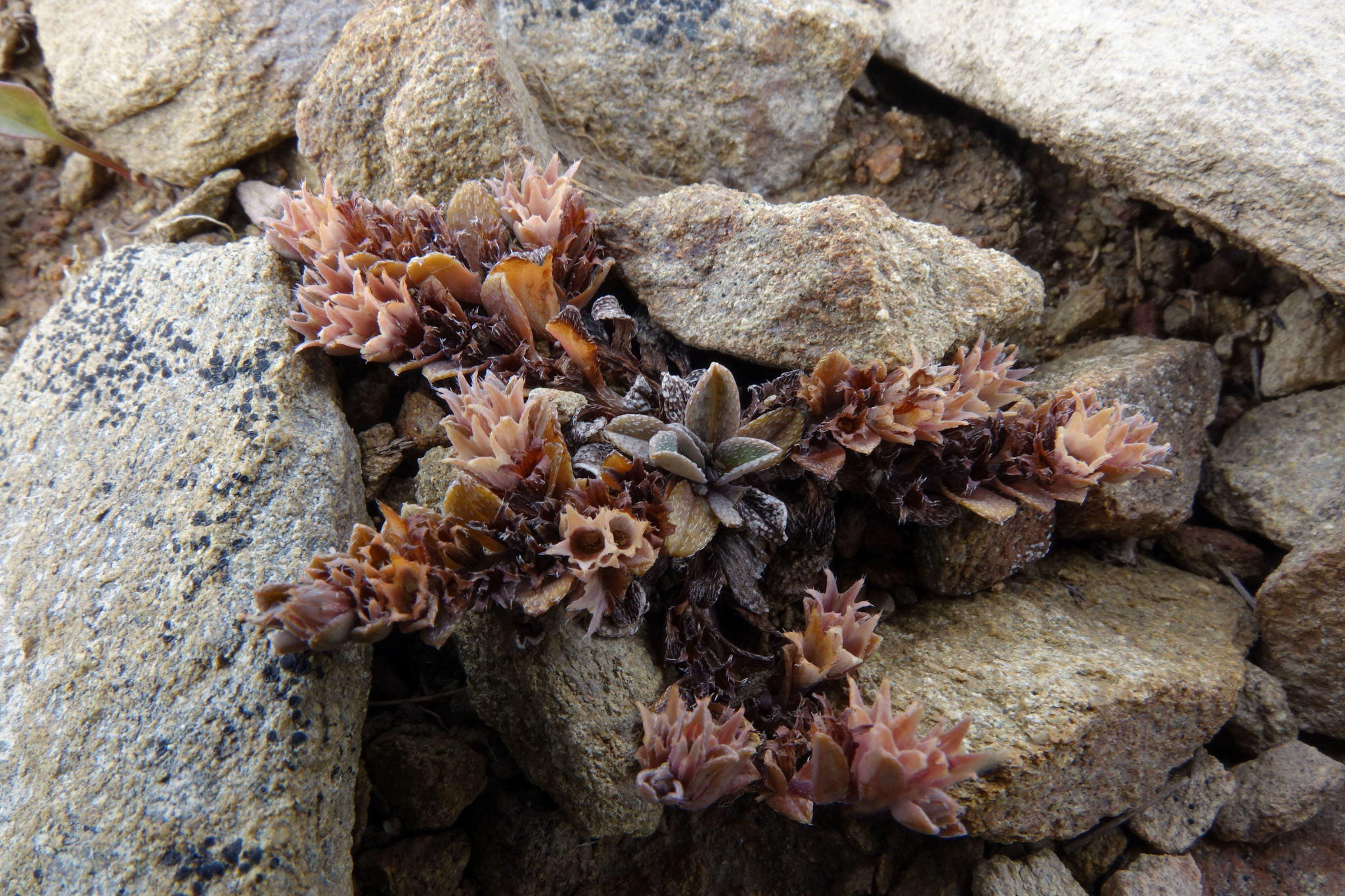
Fruiting plant

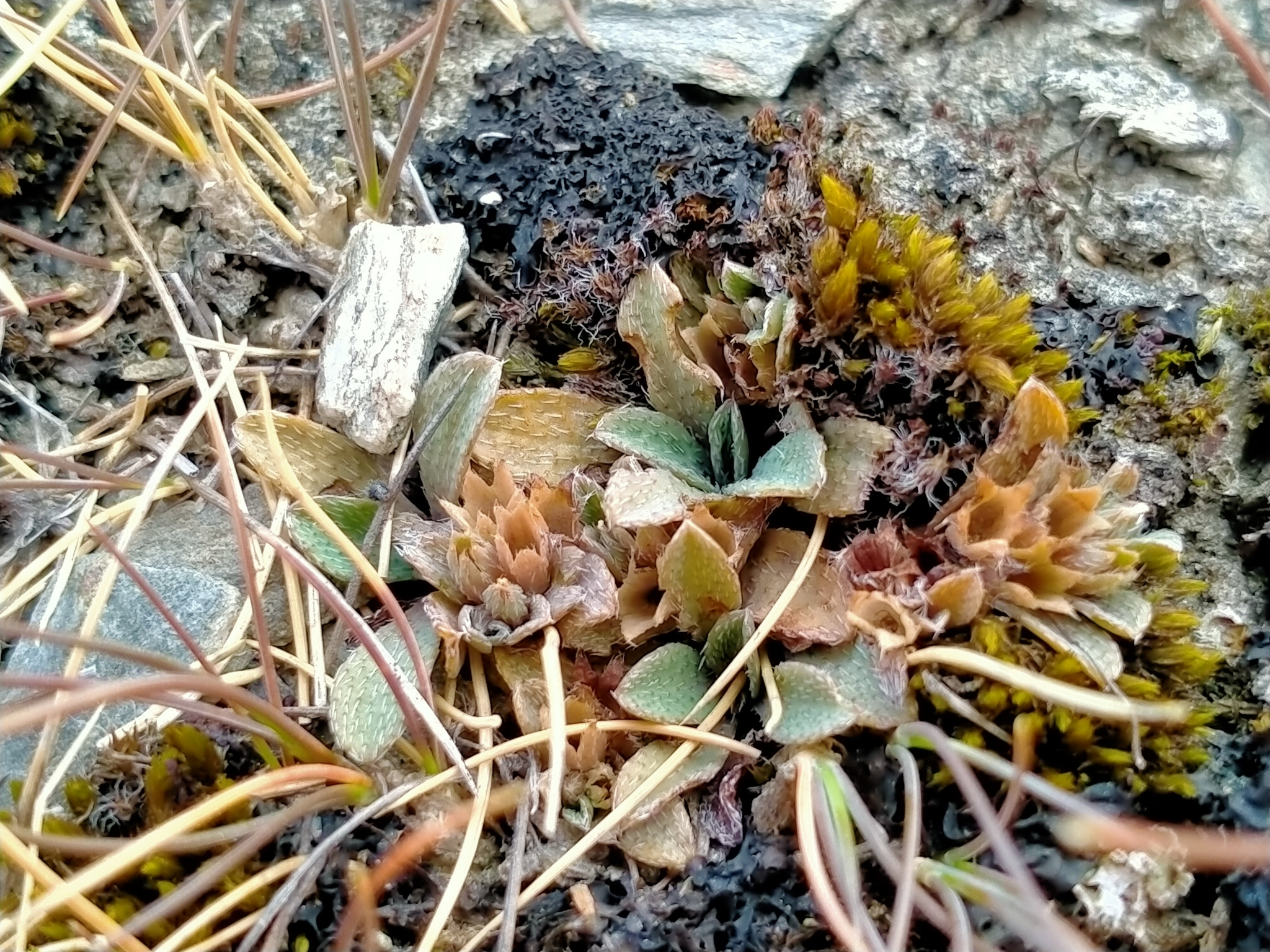
Fruiting plant

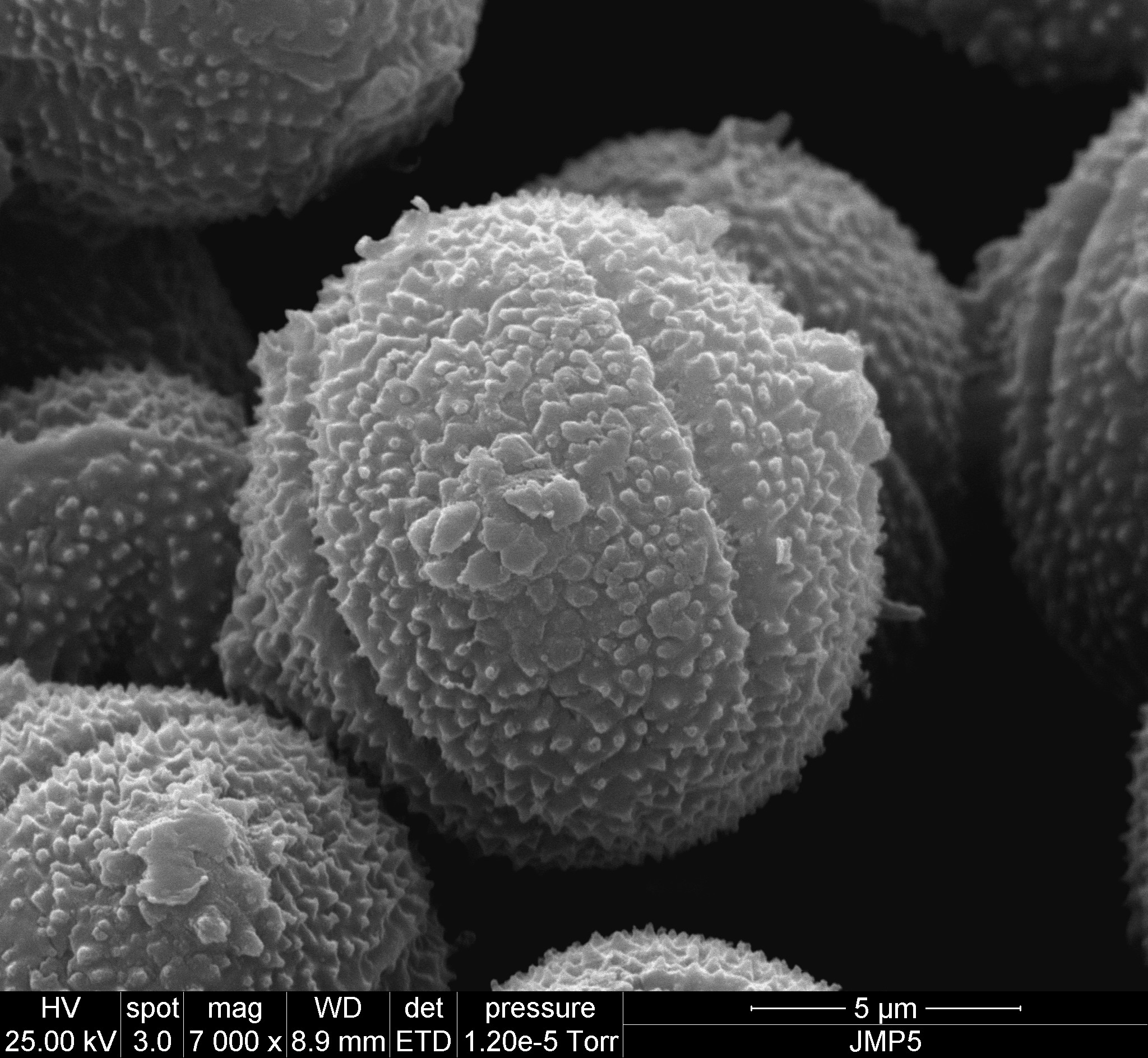
Pollen grain

== Distribution and habitat ==
Myosotis glauca is a forget-me-not endemic to the mountains of the South Island of New Zealand. It is mainly found in Otago, but is also known from south Canterbury, from 180–1500 m ASL. M. glauca is found in tussock-grassland, turf and the edges of tarns or streams.

== Conservation status ==
The species is listed as "Threatened - Nationally Vulnerable" on the most recent assessment (2017-2018) under the New Zealand Threatened Classification system for plants, with the qualifiers "DP" (Data Poor) and "Sp" (Sparse). A recent taxonomic revision recommended maintaining this conservation status, but replacing qualifier "DP" with "RR" (Range Restricted).
