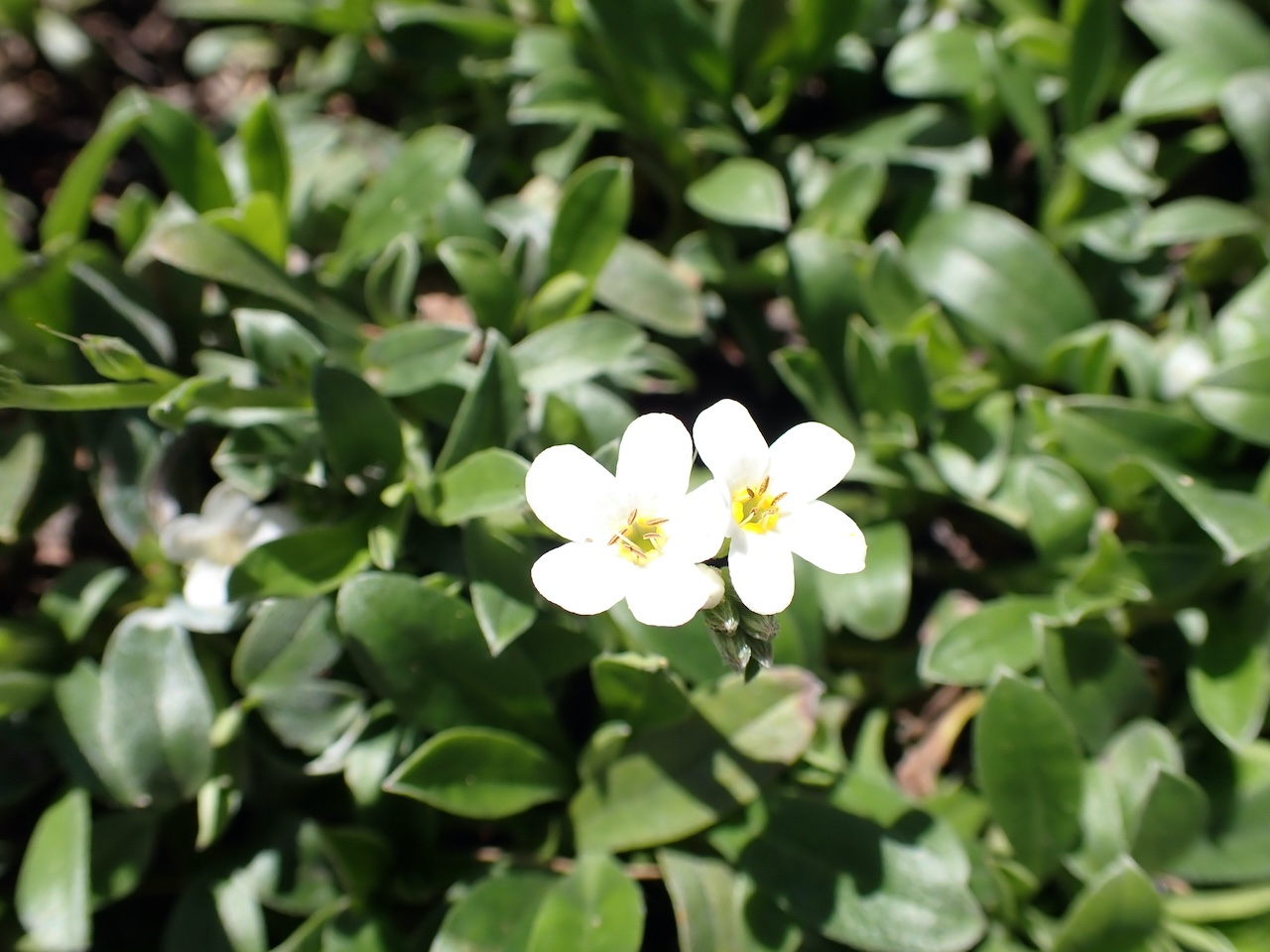

Conservation status
- Naturally Uncommon (NZ TCS)

Scientific classification
- Kingdom: Plantae
- Clade: Tracheophytes
- Clade: Angiosperms
- Clade: Eudicots
- Clade: Asterids
- Order: Boraginales
- Family: Boraginaceae
- Genus: Myosotis
- Species: M. eximia

Binomial name
- Myosotis eximia Petrie

= Myosotis eximia =

Species of flowering plant

Myosotis eximia is a species of flowering plant in the family Boraginaceae endemic to the North Island of New Zealand. The species was described by Donald Petrie. Plants of this species of forget-me-not are perennial and erect, and have ebracteate inflorescences with white corollas.

== Taxonomy and Etymology ==
Myosotis eximia Petrie is in the plant family Boraginaceae and was originally described in 1915 by Donald Petrie. This species was first collected in December 1914 by Bernard Aston on the slopes of Mt Aorangi, in the Ruahine Ranges, where it formed "continuous patches several feet across, adorned by masses of lovely flowers." at an altitude of 3,900 feet (1,200 m). The species epithet, eximia, means "strikingly unusual".

== Description ==
Myosotis eximia is an extensively-branched spreading perennial, which forms clusters of tight rosettes with erect, ebracteate flowering stems. The leaves are sparsely covered in dense, straight hairs that lie flat against the leaf. M. eximia flowers in December and January; its flowers, which Petrie described as "large and showy, white with a yellow eye", have projecting anthers. The anthers are only 2 mm long, much shorter than their filaments.

Myosotis eximia has M. angustata type pollen.

The chromosome number of M. eximia is 2n = 44.

It flowers from December to January and fruits from February to April.

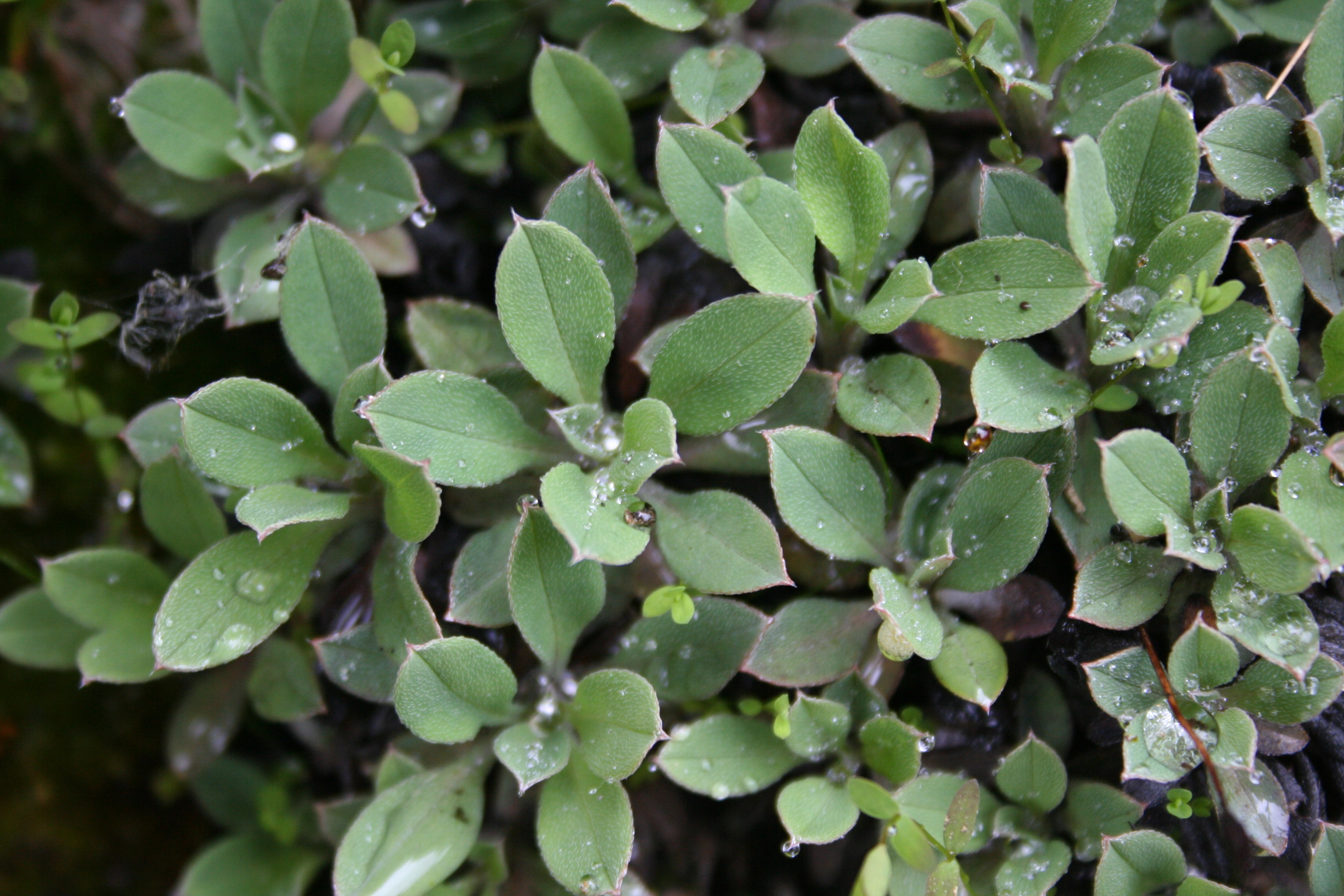
Rosette leaves

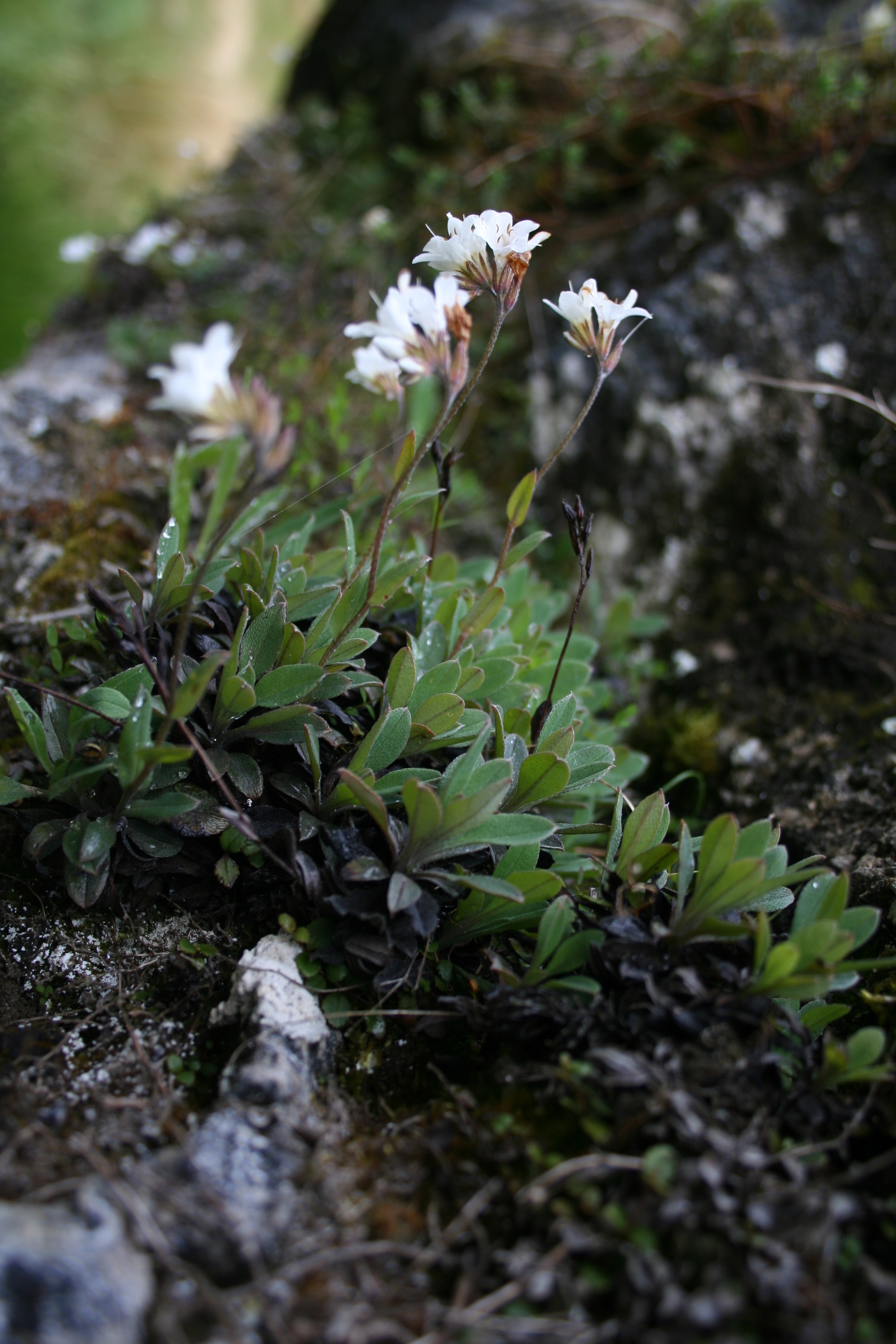
Plants growing on rock

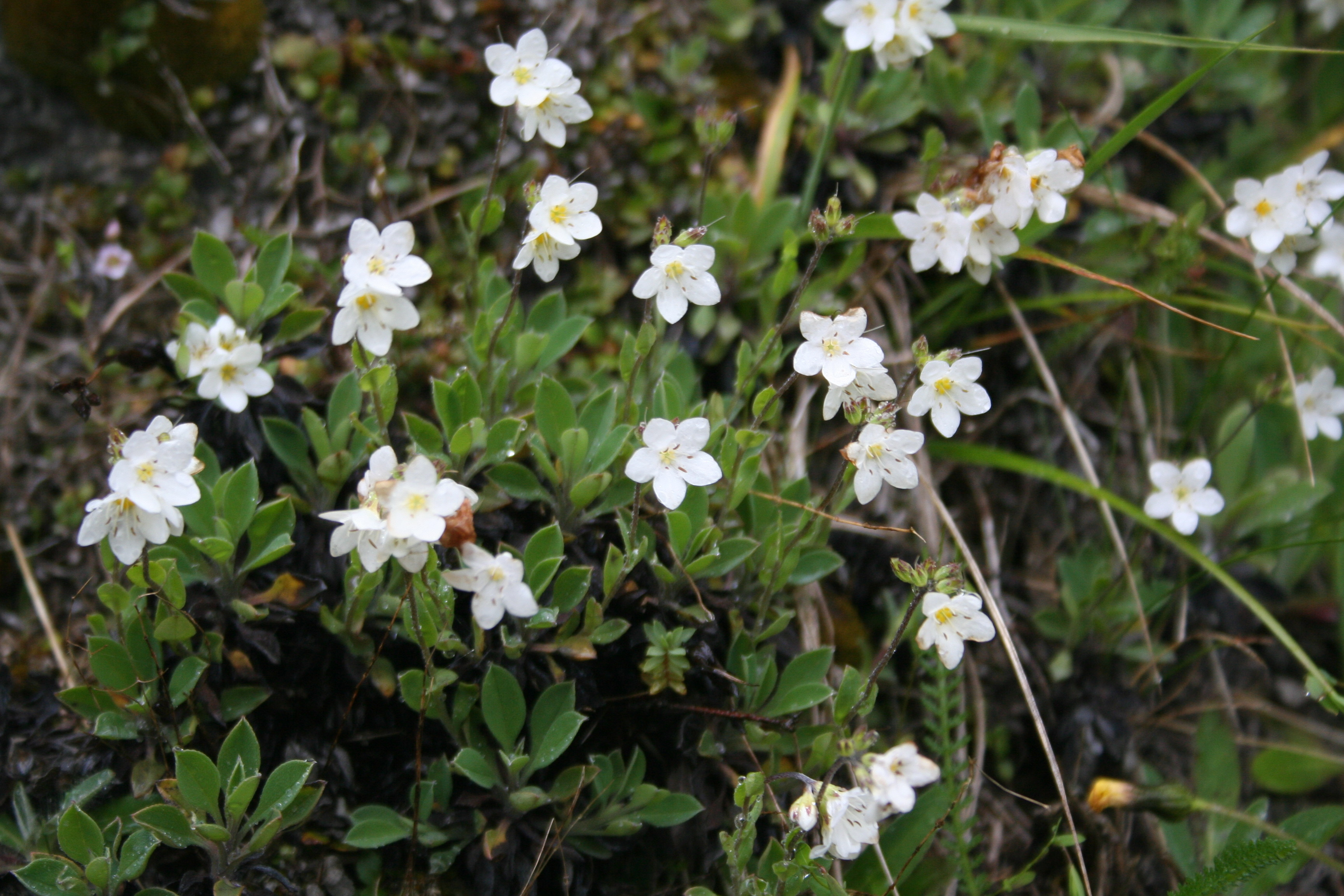
Flowering plants

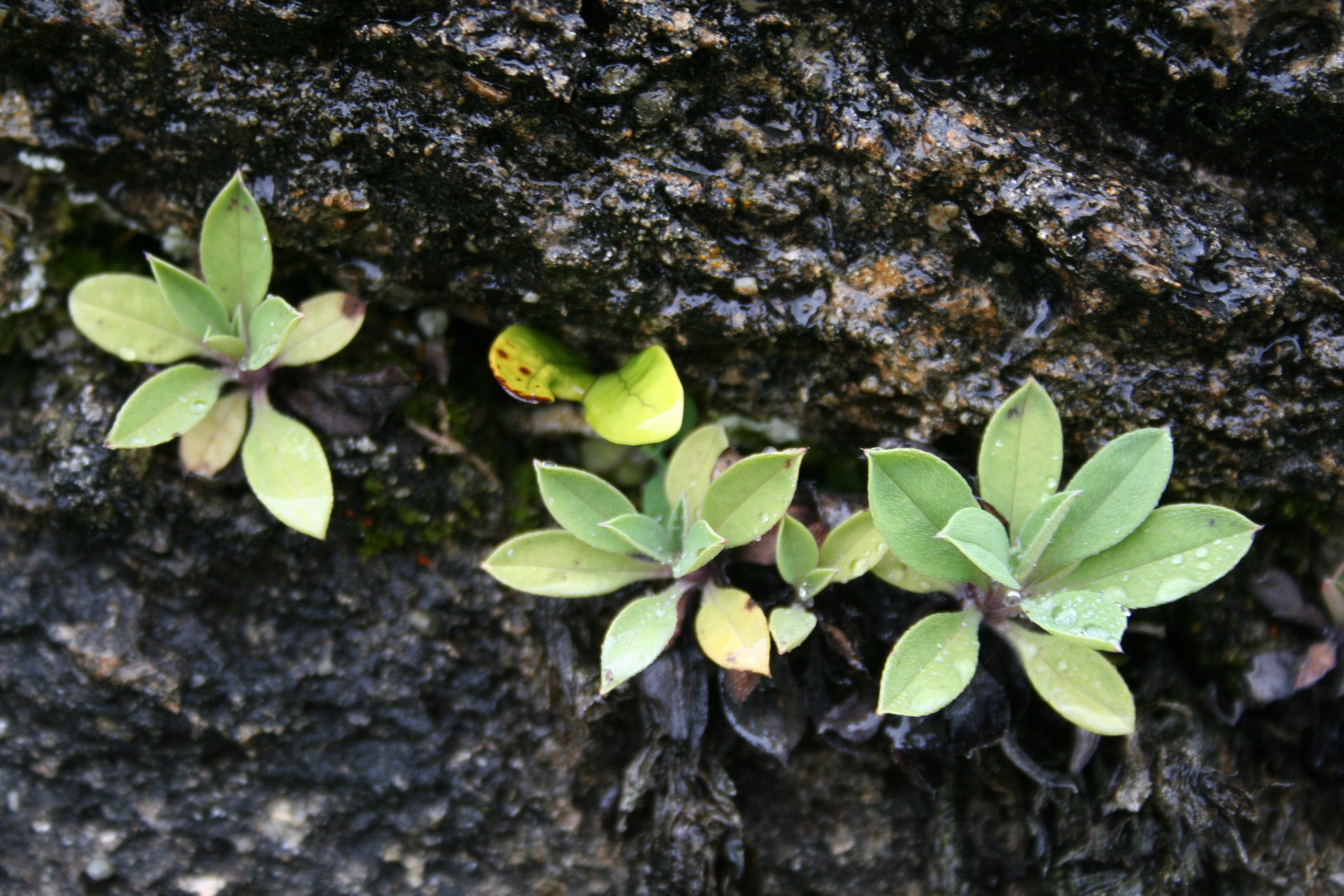
Rosettes on rock

== Distribution and habitat ==
The species is endemic to New Zealand, and has a very restricted distribution, known only from the Kaimanawa and Ruahine Ranges in the central North Island. It lives in the subalpine to alpine zone, on scree slopes and limestone bluffs. It prefers alkaline soils on limestone or calcareous sandstone.

== Phylogeny ==
Myosotis eximia was shown to be a part of the monophyletic southern hemisphere lineage of Myosotis in phylogenetic analyses of standard DNA sequencing markers (nuclear ribosomal DNA and chloroplast DNA regions). Within the southern hemisphere lineage, species relationships were not well resolved. The chloroplast sequences of the sole individual of M. eximia were more similar to some species with bracteate inflorescences rather than other North Island species with ebracteate inflorescences.

A 2025 phylogenomic study based on DNA from whole plastids, target capture of universal angiosperm bait markers, and the full nuclear ribosomal DNA cistron, included five individuals of M. eximia. All three data sets showed that the North Island endemic species of Myosotis (M. eximia, M. matthewsii, M. pansa, M. petiolata, M. pottsiana and M. saxosa) were not a monophyletic group but were found in the same clade, with M. eximia most closely related to M. petiolata and M. saxosa. In the plastid tree, M. eximia was highly supported as monophyletic, whereas there was moderate to high support for all five sampled individuals grouping in the same small clade in the other two data sets.

== Conservation status ==
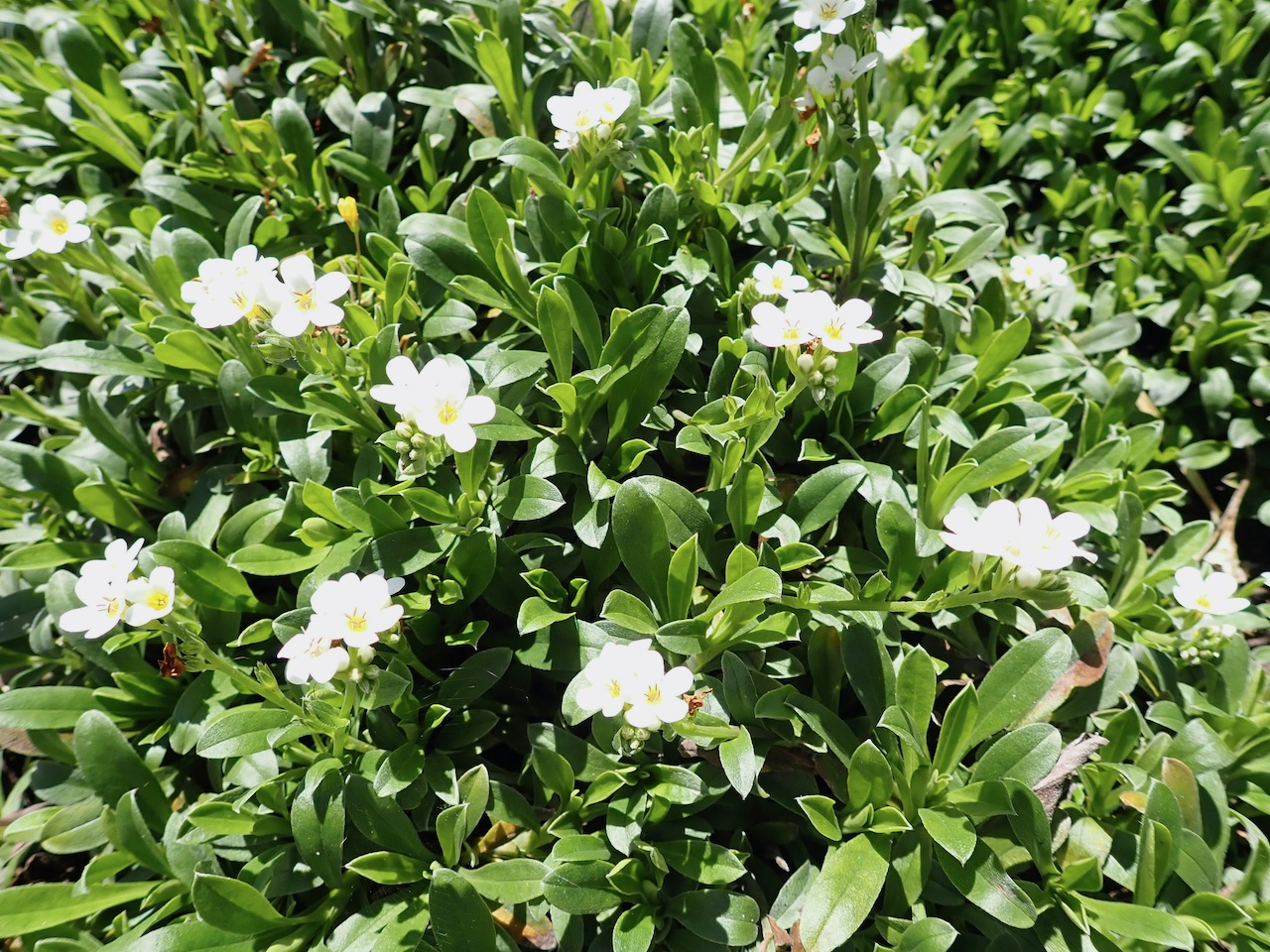
Myosotis eximia growing in cultivation at Otari-Wilton's Bush.

Myosotis eximia is listed by the Department of Conservation as "At Risk – Naturally Uncommon" on the most recent assessment (2023) of the New Zealand Threat Classification for plants, a status which did not change from the previous assessment. Its numbers are thought to be stable, with the qualifiers "DPS" (Data Poor: Size), "DPT" (Data Poor: Trend) and "RR" (Range Restricted). Because of its specialised habitat requirements, its populations are small and localised, but do not seem to be under threat.

== Cultivation ==
This species grows surprisingly well in gardens, preferring soil with some added lime, and is often for sale in native plant nurseries. It needs a sunny, well drained situation, and will flower heavily even in warm climates far from its natural subalpine habitat.
