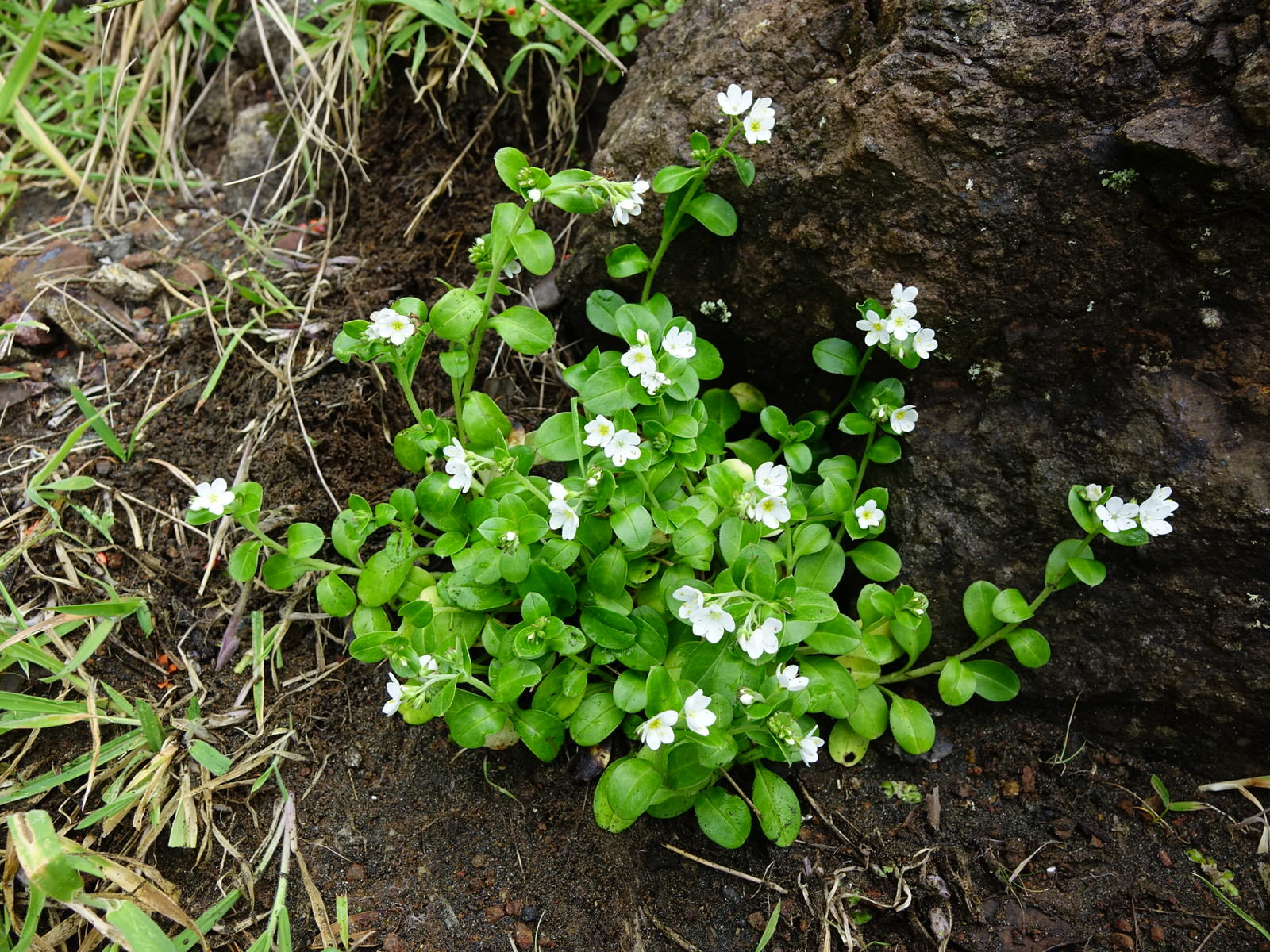

Conservation status
- Nationally Endangered (NZ TCS)

Scientific classification
- Kingdom: Plantae
- Clade: Tracheophytes
- Clade: Angiosperms
- Clade: Eudicots
- Clade: Asterids
- Order: Boraginales
- Family: Boraginaceae
- Genus: Myosotis
- Species: M. pansa
- Subspecies: M. p. subsp. pansa

Trinomial name
- Myosotis pansa subsp. pansa (L.B. Moore) Meudt, Prebble, R.J. Stanley
- Native range of Myosotis pansa: subsp. pansa subsp. praeceps

Synonyms
- Myosotis petiolata var. pansa

= Myosotis pansa subsp. pansa =

Species of flowering plant

Myosotis pansa subsp. pansa, also known as the Waitakere forget-me-not, is a subspecies of flowering plant in the family Boraginaceae, endemic to the North Island of New Zealand. Lucy Moore described the variety M. petiolata var. pansa in 1961, and it was transferred to a subspecies of M. pansa by Heidi Meudt, Jessica Prebble, Rebecca Stanley and Michael Thorsen in 2013. Plants of this species of forget-me-not are perennial rosettes with ebracteate inflorescences and white corollas with exserted stamens.

== Taxonomy and etymology ==
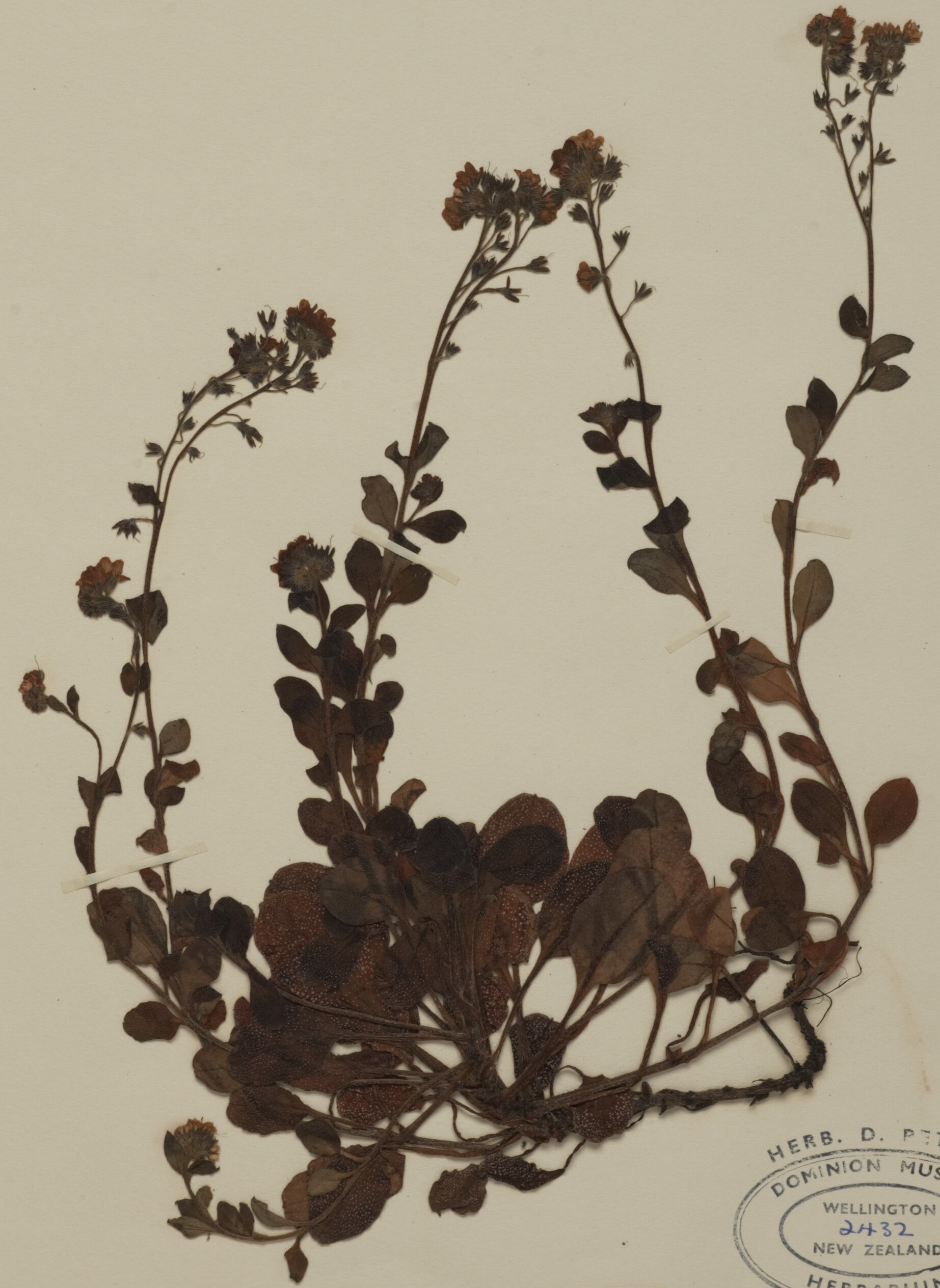
Lectotype specimen of Myosotis pansa subsp. pansa (WELT SP002432)

Myosotis pansa subsp. pansa is in the plant family Boraginaceae. The subspecies was originally described as a variety of Myosotis petiolata in 1961 by Lucy Moore. The plant and others in the genus of Myosotis are colloquially known as forget-me-nots. It was transferred to subspecies rank under Myosotis pansa (L.B.Moore) Meudt, Prebble, R.J.Stanley and Thorsen in 2013.

The lectotype specimen of Myosotis pansa was collected by Donald Petrie, south of Karekare, Waitākere Ranges, Auckland, and is lodged at the Museum of New Zealand Te Papa Tongarewa, Wellington (WELT SP002432).

The specific epithet, pansa, is based on the Latin word pansus which means to spread out. Lucy Moore did not explain why she chose this name, but it could refer to the spreading petal lobes mentioned in her description.

Based on morphological and genotyping evidence, this is one of two subspecies recognised in M. pansa; the other is M. pansa subsp. praeceps. The subspecies are largely allopatric, as M. pansa subsp. pansa is found in the Auckland region in the North Island of New Zealand, whereas M. pansa subsp. praeceps is found further south, in coastal areas of Waikato and Taranaki on the North Island. In subsp. pansa, the inflorescences are ebracteate (i.e. none of the flowers have associated cauline leaves), whereas in subsp. praeceps the inflorescences are partially bracteate (i.e. there are cauline leaves associated with the lowest 1–3 or up to 9 flowers).

== Phylogeny ==
Myosotis pansa subsp. pansa was shown to be a part of the monophyletic southern hemisphere lineage of Myosotis in phylogenetic analyses of standard DNA sequencing markers (nuclear ribosomal DNA and chloroplast DNA regions). Within the southern hemisphere lineage, species relationships were not well resolved.

Multiple individuals of Myosotis pansa subsp. pansa were included in two studies that phylogenetically analysed amplified fragment length polymorphisms (AFLPs). In these analyses, Myosotis pansa subsp. pansa was genetically differentiated M. pansa subsp. pracepes, as well as from other related species, M. petiolata and M. pottsiana.

== Description ==
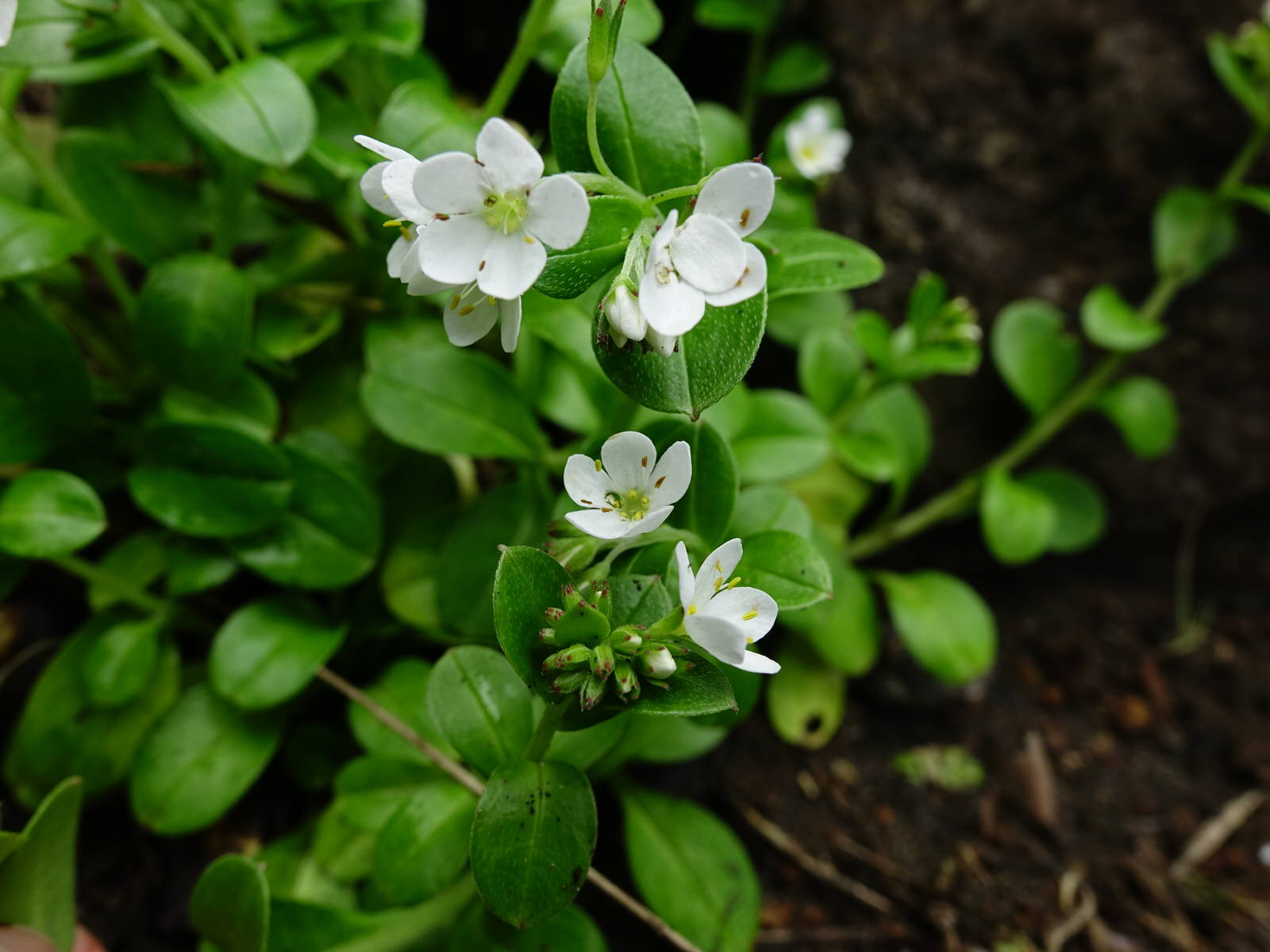
Flowers of Myosotis pansa subsp. pansa

Myosotis pansa plants are rosettes. The rosette leaves have petioles that are 4–67 mm (0.16–2.64 in) long. The rosette leaf blades are 5–60 mm (0.20–2.36 in) long by 4–31 mm (0.16–1.22 in) wide (length: width ratio 1.1–2.1: 1), usually narrowly obovate, obovate, broadly obovate, widest at or above the middle, with an obtuse and retuse apex. The upper surface of the leaf is uniformly or patchily covered in straight, appressed, antrorse (forward-facing) hairs. The lower surface of the leaf is glabrous. Each rosette has multiple ascending, once-branched or rarely unbranched ebracteate inflorescences that are up to 490 mm (19 in) long. The cauline leaves are similar to the rosette leaves, but become smaller. The flowers are 3–95 per inflorescence and each is borne on a short pedicel with or without a bract. The calyx is 2–4 mm (0.079–0.157 in) long at flowering and 3–9 mm (0.12–0.35 in) long at fruiting, lobed to half to most of its length, and sparsely to densely covered in straight to curved, appressed to patent, antrorse hairs. The corolla is white and 4–11 mm (0.16–0.43 in) in diameter, with a cylindrical tube, petals that are usually obovate, broadly obovate or very broadly obovate, and small yellow scales alternating with the petals. The anthers are fully exserted. The four smooth, shiny, usually dark brown nutlets are 1.4–2.1 mm (0.055–0.083 in) long by 1.0–1.4 mm (0.039–0.055 in) wide and ovoid to broadly ovoid in shape.

The pollen of Myosotis pansa subsp. pansa is unknown.

The chromosome number of M. pansa subsp. pansa is 2n = 44 for two Auckland War Memorial Museum specimens collected from the Waitākere Ranges.

== Distribution and habitat ==
Myosotis pansa subsp. pansa is endemic to the North Island of New Zealand in the Auckland region, from sea level to 200 m (660 ft) ASL. It can only be found on Waitakere coastline from Muriwai Beach to Waterfall Bay. M. pansa is found on coastal cliffs, coastal scrub nearby grassy slopes. It is usually found with Celmisia major, the cliff daisy, and Myosotis antarctica subsp. traillii (as M. pygmaea) in limited areas on the western coast of the Waitākere Ranges. It usually grows close to the sea, within open forest or scrub, and more open habitats such as the base of cliffs.

== Conservation status ==
Myosotis pansa subsp. pansa is listed as Threatened - Nationally Endangered in the most recent assessment (2017-2018) of the New Zealand Threatened Classification for plants.
