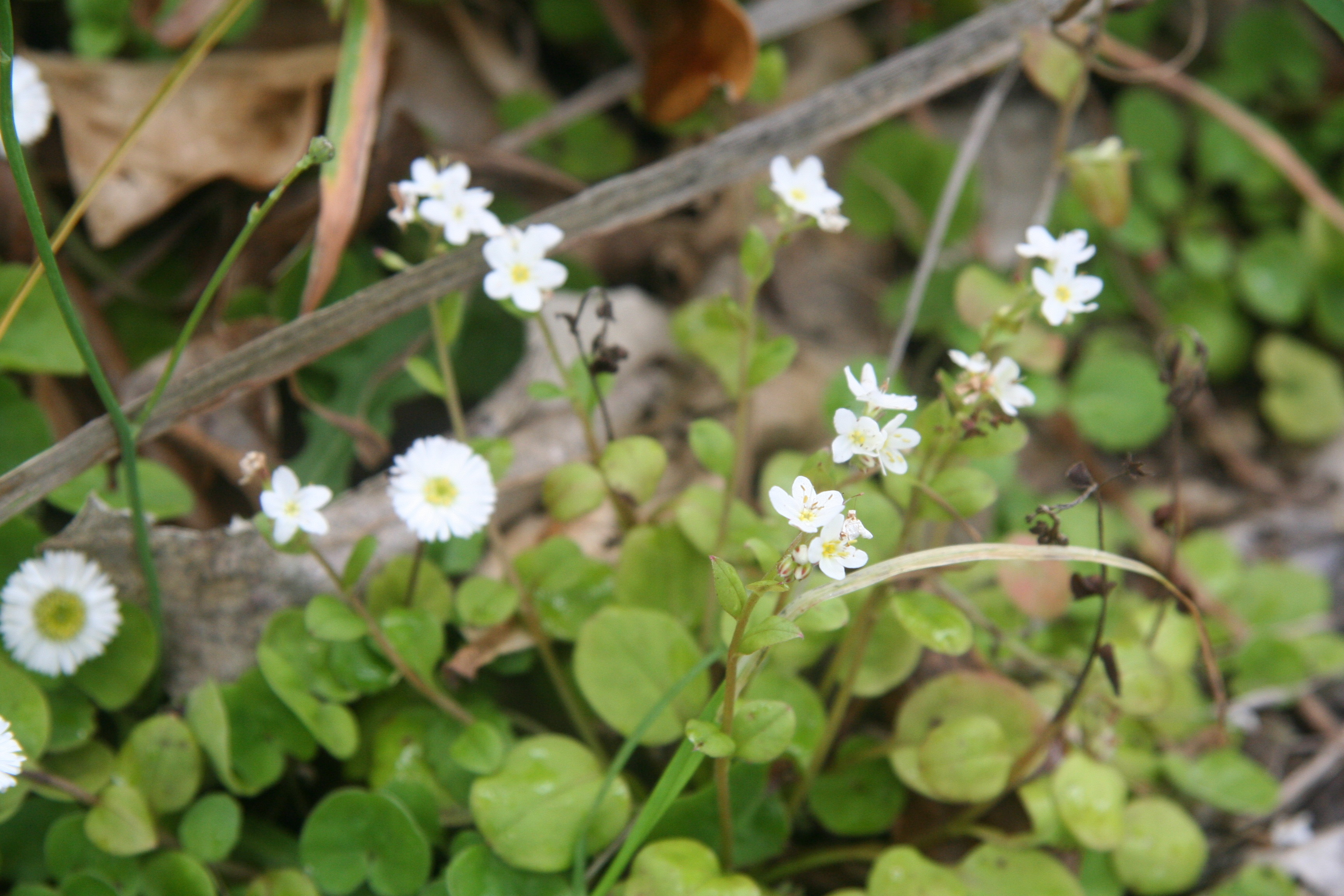

Conservation status
- Nationally Vulnerable (NZ TCS)

Scientific classification
- Kingdom: Plantae
- Clade: Tracheophytes
- Clade: Angiosperms
- Clade: Eudicots
- Clade: Asterids
- Order: Boraginales
- Family: Boraginaceae
- Genus: Myosotis
- Species: M. pansa
- Subspecies: M. p. subsp. praeceps

Trinomial name
- Myosotis pansa subsp. praeceps Meudt, Prebble, R.J.Stanley & Thorsen
- Native range of Myosotis pansa: subsp. pansa subsp. praeceps

= Myosotis pansa subsp. praeceps =

Subspecies of flowering plant

Myosotis pansa subsp. praeceps is a subspecies of flowering plant in the family Boraginaceae, endemic to the North Island of New Zealand. Lucy Moore described the variety M. petiolata var. pansa in 1961, and it was transferred to a subspecies of M. pansa by Heidi Meudt, Jessica Prebble, Rebecca Stanley and Michael Thorsen in 2013. Plants of this species of forget-me-not are perennial rosettes with partially bracteate inflorescences and white corollas with exserted stamens.

== Taxonomy and etymology ==
Myosotis pansa subsp. praeceps is in the plant family Boraginaceae. The subspecies was originally described as a variety of Myosotis petiolata in 1961 by Lucy Moore. The plant and others in the genus of Myosotis are colloquially known as forget-me-nots. Plants in the genus are also referred to as Scorpion grass. It was transferred to subspecies rank under Myosotis pansa by (L.B.Moore) Meudt, Prebble, R.J.Stanley and Thorsen in 2013.

The holotype specimen of Myosotis pansa subsp. praeceps was collected by Anthony P. Druce in 1972 at Waikawau Beach, and is lodged at the Allan Herbarium of Manaaki Whenua – Landcare Research (CHR 208886).

The subspecies epithet, praeceps, is a Latin word with two relevant meanings: 'precipice' (referring to its habitat), and 'danger' (referring to its threatened status).

Based on morphological and genotyping evidence, this is one of two subspecies recognised in M. pansa; the other is M. pansa subsp. pansa. The subspecies are largely allopatric, as M. pansa subsp. praeceps is found in coastal areas of Waikato and northern Taranaki on the North Island, whereas M. pansa subsp. pansa is found in the Auckland region. In subsp. praeceps the inflorescences are partially bracteate (i.e. there are cauline leaves associated with the lowest 1–3 or up to 9 flowers, whereas in subsp. pansa, the inflorescences are ebracteate (i.e. none of the flowers have associated cauline leaves).

== Phylogeny ==
Myosotis pansa subsp. praeceps was shown to be a part of the monophyletic southern hemisphere lineage of Myosotis in phylogenetic analyses of standard DNA sequencing markers (nuclear ribosomal DNA and chloroplast DNA regions). Within the southern hemisphere lineage, species relationships were not well resolved.

Multiple individuals Myosotis pansa subsp. praeceps were included in two studies that phylogenetically analysed amplified fragment length polymorphisms (AFLPs). In these analyses, Myosotis pansa subsp. praeceps was genetically differentiated from M. pansa subsp. pansa, as well as from other related species, M. petiolata and M. pottsiana.

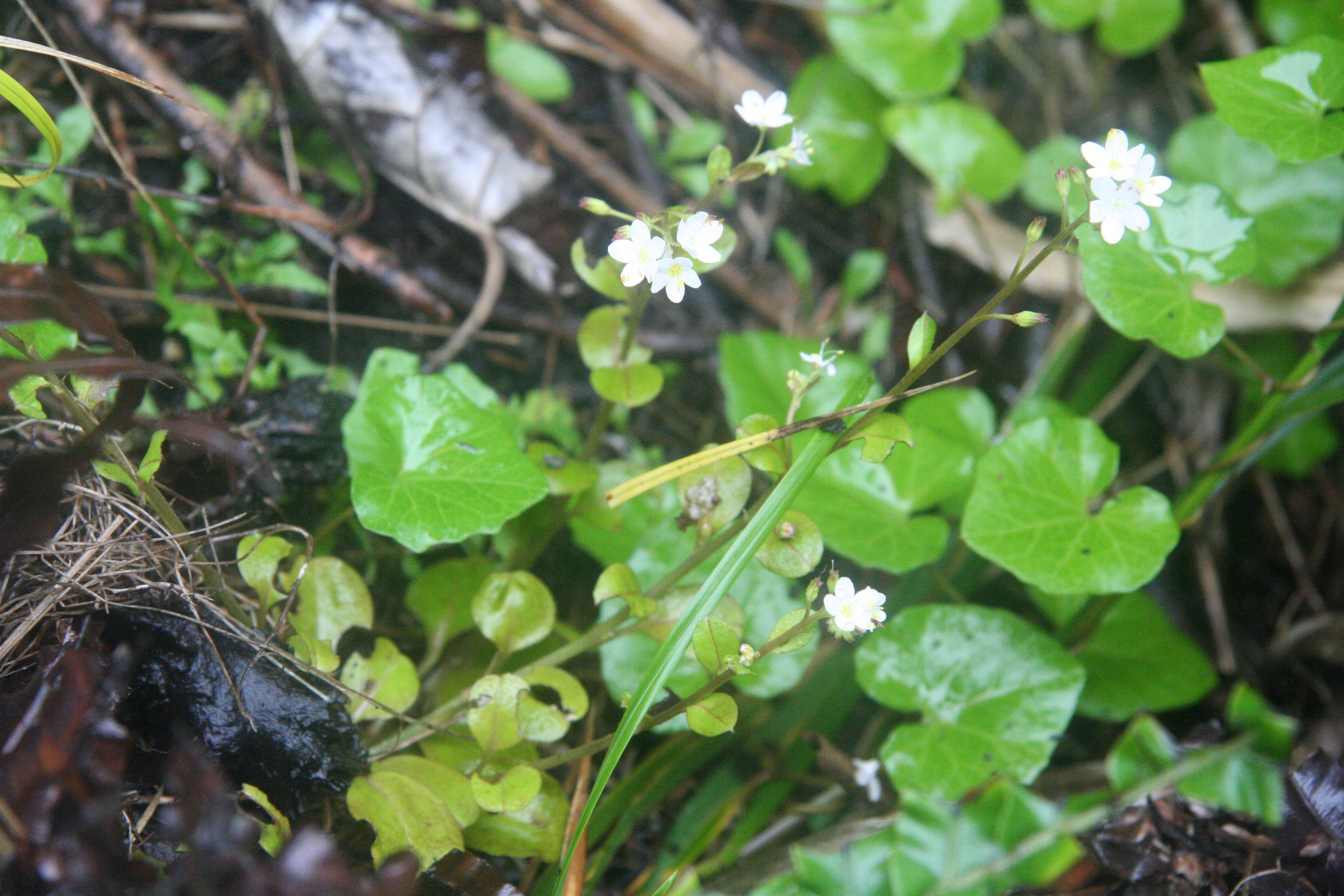

== Description ==
Myosotis pansa plants are rosettes. The rosette leaves have petioles that are 4 to 67 mm long. The rosette leaf blades are 5 to 60 mm long by 4 to 31 mm wide (with a length-to-width ratio of 1.1:1 to 2.1:1), usually narrowly obovate, obovate, broadly obovate, widest at or above the middle, with an obtuse and retuse apex. The upper surface of the leaf is uniformly or patchily covered in straight, appressed, antrorse (forward-facing) hairs. The lower surface of the leaf is glabrous. Each rosette has multiple ascending, once-branched or rarely unbranched partially bracteate inflorescences that are up to 490 mm long. The cauline leaves are similar to the rosette leaves, but become smaller. The flowers are 3 to 95 per inflorescence and each is borne on a short pedicel with or without a bract. The calyx is 2 to 4 mm long at flowering and 3 to 9 mm long at fruiting, lobed to half to most of its length, and sparsely to densely covered in straight to curved, appressed to patent, antrorse hairs. The corolla is white and 4 to 11 mm in diameter, with a cylindrical tube, petals that are usually obovate, broadly obovate or very broadly obovate, and small yellow scales alternating with the petals. The anthers are fully exserted. The four smooth, shiny, usually dark brown nutlets are 1.4 to 2.1 mm long by 1.0 to 1.4 mm wide, and ovoid to broadly ovoid in shape.

Published studies of the pollen and chromosome numbers of several species of Myosotis did not include Myosotis pansa subsp. praeceps.

== Distribution and habitat ==
Myosotis pansa subsp. praeceps is endemic to the North Island of New Zealand. It only grows on the west coast from Taharoa (Waikato) to northern Taranaki. It occurs from sea level to 200 metres (660 ft) above sea level, on coastal cliffs, coastal scrub nearby grassy slopes.

== Conservation status ==
Myosotis pansa subsp. praeceps is listed as Threatened – Nationally Vulnerable in the most recent assessment (2017–2018) of the New Zealand Threatened Classification for plants.
