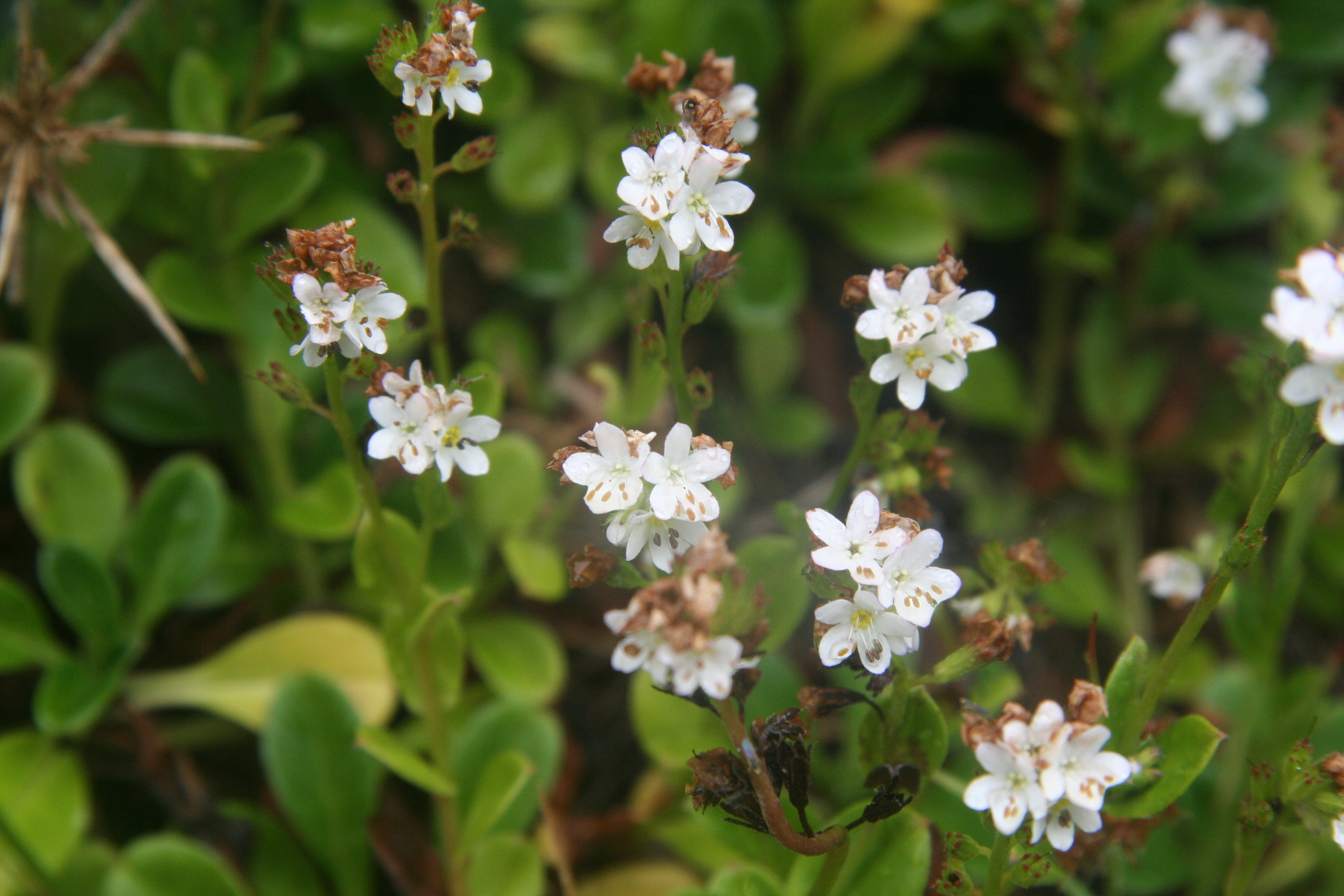
- Myosotis pansa in flower in the field

Conservation status
- Nationally Endangered (NZ TCS)

Scientific classification
- Kingdom: Plantae
- Clade: Tracheophytes
- Clade: Angiosperms
- Clade: Eudicots
- Clade: Asterids
- Order: Boraginales
- Family: Boraginaceae
- Genus: Myosotis
- Species: M. pansa

Binomial name
- Myosotis pansa (L.B. Moore) Meudt, Prebble, R.J. Stanley

Subspecies
- Myosotis pansa subsp. praeceps; Myosotis pansa subsp. pansa
- Native range of Myosotis pansa: subsp. pansa subsp. praeceps

= Myosotis pansa =

Species of flowering plant

Myosotis pansa is a species of flowering plant in the family Boraginaceae, endemic to the North Island of New Zealand. Lucy Moore described the variety M. petiolata var. pansa in 1961, and it was raised to species level as M. pansa by Heidi Meudt, Jessica Prebble, Rebecca Stanley and Michael Thorsen in 2013. Plants of this species of forget-me-not are perennial rosettes with ebracteate (or partially bracteate) inflorescences and white corollas and exserted anthers.

== Taxonomy and etymology ==
Myosotis pansa is in the plant family Boraginaceae and was originally described as a variety of Myosotis petiolata in 1961 by Lucy Moore. It was raised to species level as Myosotis pansa (L.B.Moore) Meudt, Prebble, R.J.Stanley and Thorsen in 2013. Myosotis pansa is morphologically most similar to the other North Island species, M. petiolata and M. pottsiana. These three species are allopatric in their geographic distributions, and can be distinguished from one another by a suite of characters that includes corolla diameter (M. pansa: 7.6–14.3 mm; M. pottsiana: 5.3–9.8 mm; and M. petiolata: 4.2–10.5 mm).

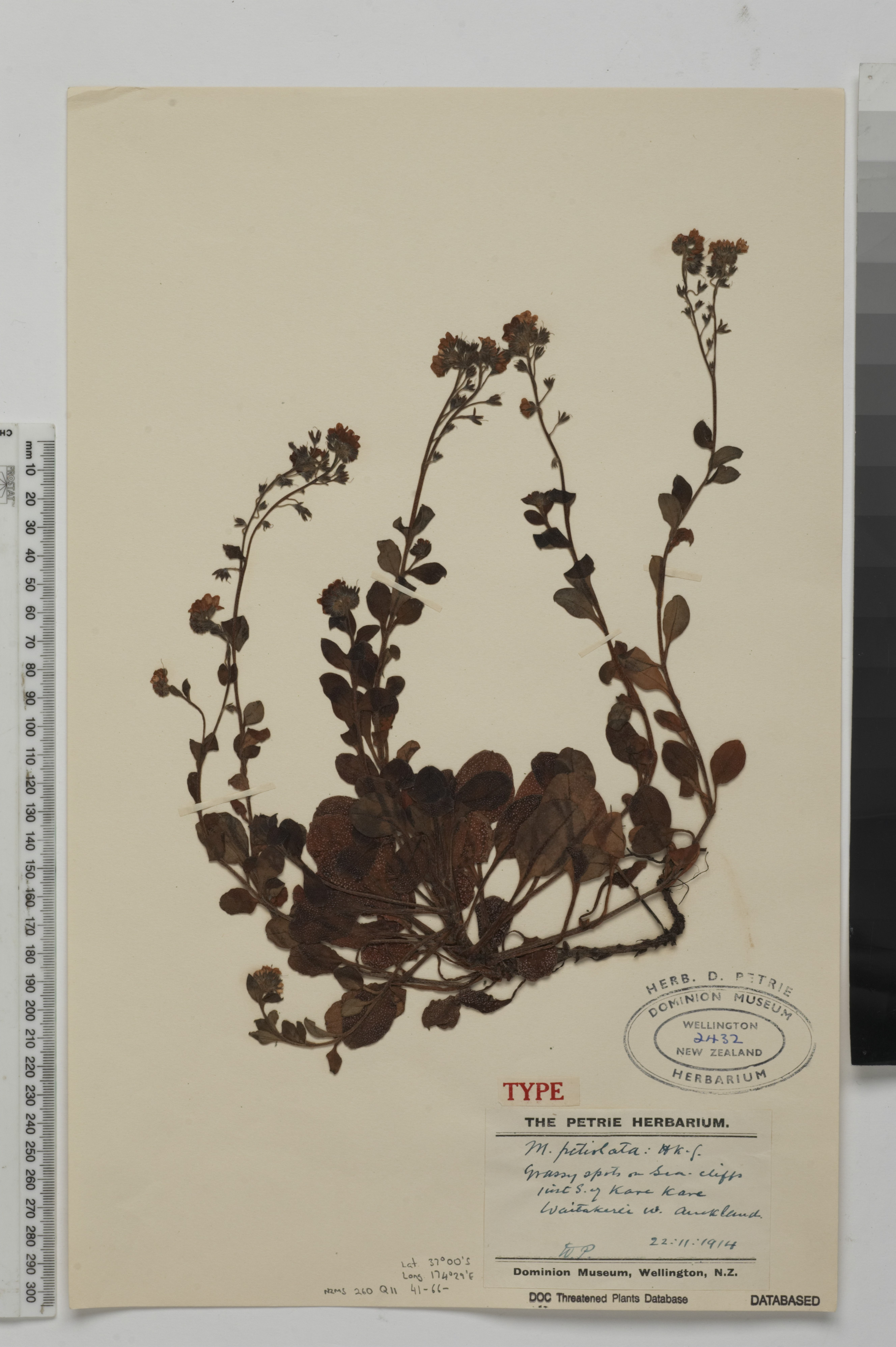
Lectotype specimen of M. pansa (WELT SP002432)

The lectotype specimen of Myosotis pansa was collected by Donald Petrie, south of Karekare, Waitakere, Auckland, and is lodged at the Museum of New Zealand Te Papa Tongarewa, Wellington (WELT SP002432).

The specific epithet, pansa, is based on the Latin word pansus which means to spread out. Lucy Moore did not explain why she chose this name, but it could refer to the spreading petal lobes mentioned in her description.

Two subspecies are recognised: Myosotis pansa subsp. pansa and M. pansa subsp. praeceps. The subspecies are allopatric, and can be distinguished from one another based on inflorescence characteristics, i.e. subsp. pansa has completely ebracteate inflorescences whereas subsp. praeceps has partially bracteate inflorescences that cauline leaves associated with the lowest 1–3 flowers (and up to 9 flowers).

== Phylogeny ==
Myosotis pansa was shown to be a part of the monophyletic southern hemisphere lineage of Myosotis in phylogenetic analyses of standard DNA sequencing markers (nuclear ribosomal DNA and chloroplast DNA regions). Within the southern hemisphere lineage, species relationships were not well resolved.

Multiple individuals of both subspecies of Myosotis pansa were included in two studies that phylogenetically analysed amplified fragment length polymorphisms (AFLPs). In these analyses, Myosotis pansa was differentiated from M. petiolata and M. pottsiana, and the two subspecies were also genetically differentiated.

== Description ==
Myosotis pansa plants are rosettes. The rosette leaves have petioles that are 4–67 mm long. The rosette leaf blades are 5–60 mm long by 4–31 mm wide (length: width ratio 1.1–2.1: 1), usually narrowly obovate, obovate, broadly obovate, widest at or above the middle, with an obtuse and retuse apex. The upper surface of the leaf is uniformly or patchily covered in straight, appressed, antrorse (forward-facing) hairs. The lower surface of the leaf is glabrous. Each rosette has multiple ascending, once-branched or rarely unbranched ebracteate or partially bracteate inflorescences that are up to 490 mm long. The cauline leaves are similar to the rosette leaves, but become smaller. The flowers are 3–95 per inflorescence and each is borne on a short pedicel with or without a bract. The calyx is 2–4 mm long at flowering and 3–9 mm long at fruiting, lobed to half to most of its length, and sparsely to densely covered in straight to curved, appressed to patent, antrorse hairs. The corolla is white and 4–11 mm in diameter, with a cylindrical tube, petals that are usually obovate, broadly obovate or very broadly obovate, and small yellow scales alternating with the petals. The anthers are fully exserted. The four smooth, shiny, usually dark brown nutlets are 1.4–2.1 mm long by 1.0–1.4 mm wide and ovoid to broadly ovoid in shape.

The pollen of Myosotis pansa is unknown.

The chromosome number of M. pansa is 2n = 44 for two Auckland Museum specimens collected from Waitakere, Auckland.

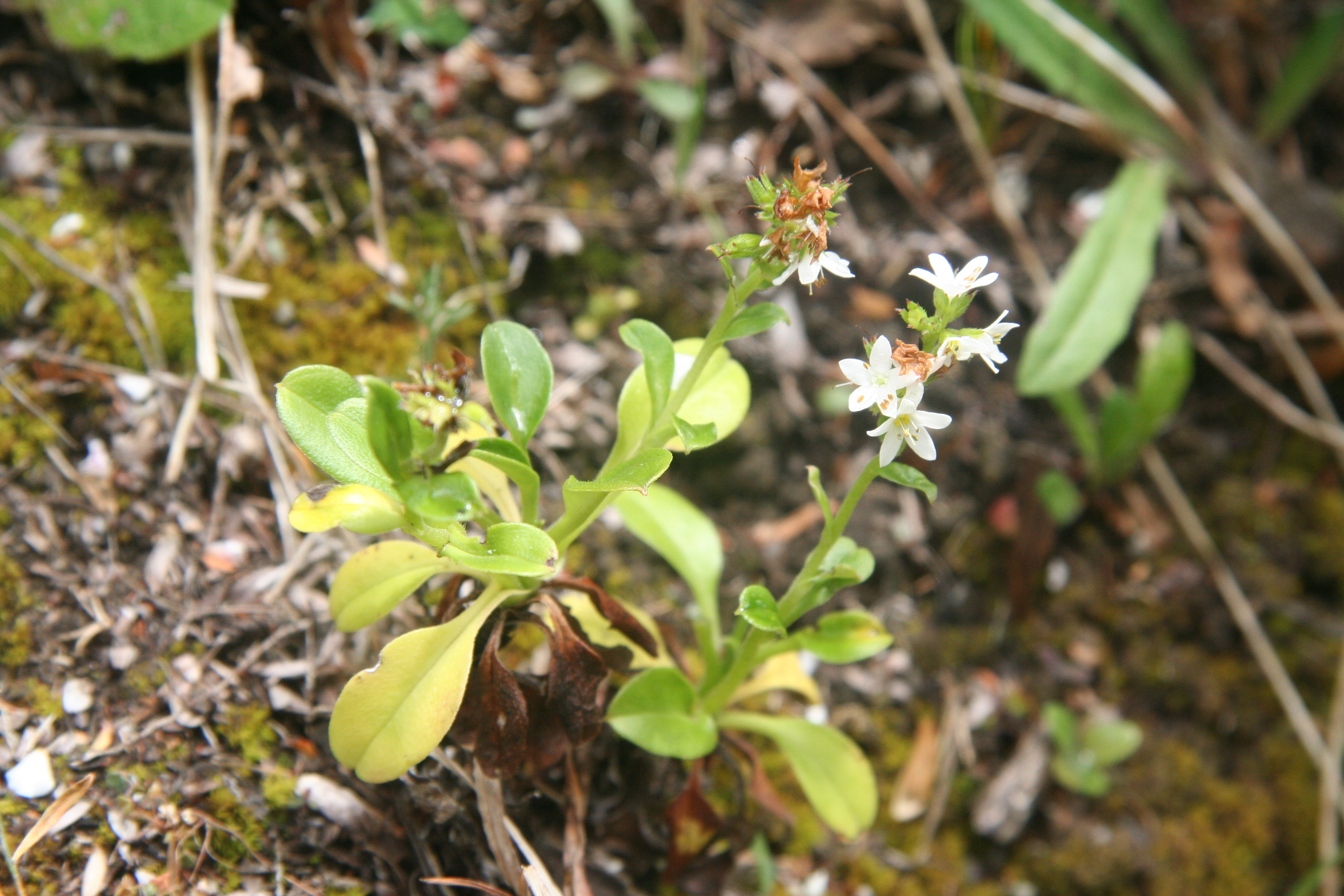
Flowering plant of M. pansa subsp. pansa

== Distribution and habitat ==
Myosotis pansa is endemic to the North Island of New Zealand from the Waitakere Ranges in Auckland to Waikato and northern Taranaki, from sea level to 200 m ASL. M. pansa is found on coastal cliffs, coastal scrub nearby grassy slopes.

== Conservation status ==
The two subspecies of M. pansa are listed as Threatened (subsp. pansa is Nationally Endangered and subsp. praeceps is Nationally Vulnerable) in the most recent assessment (2017-2018) of the New Zealand Threatened Classification for plants.
