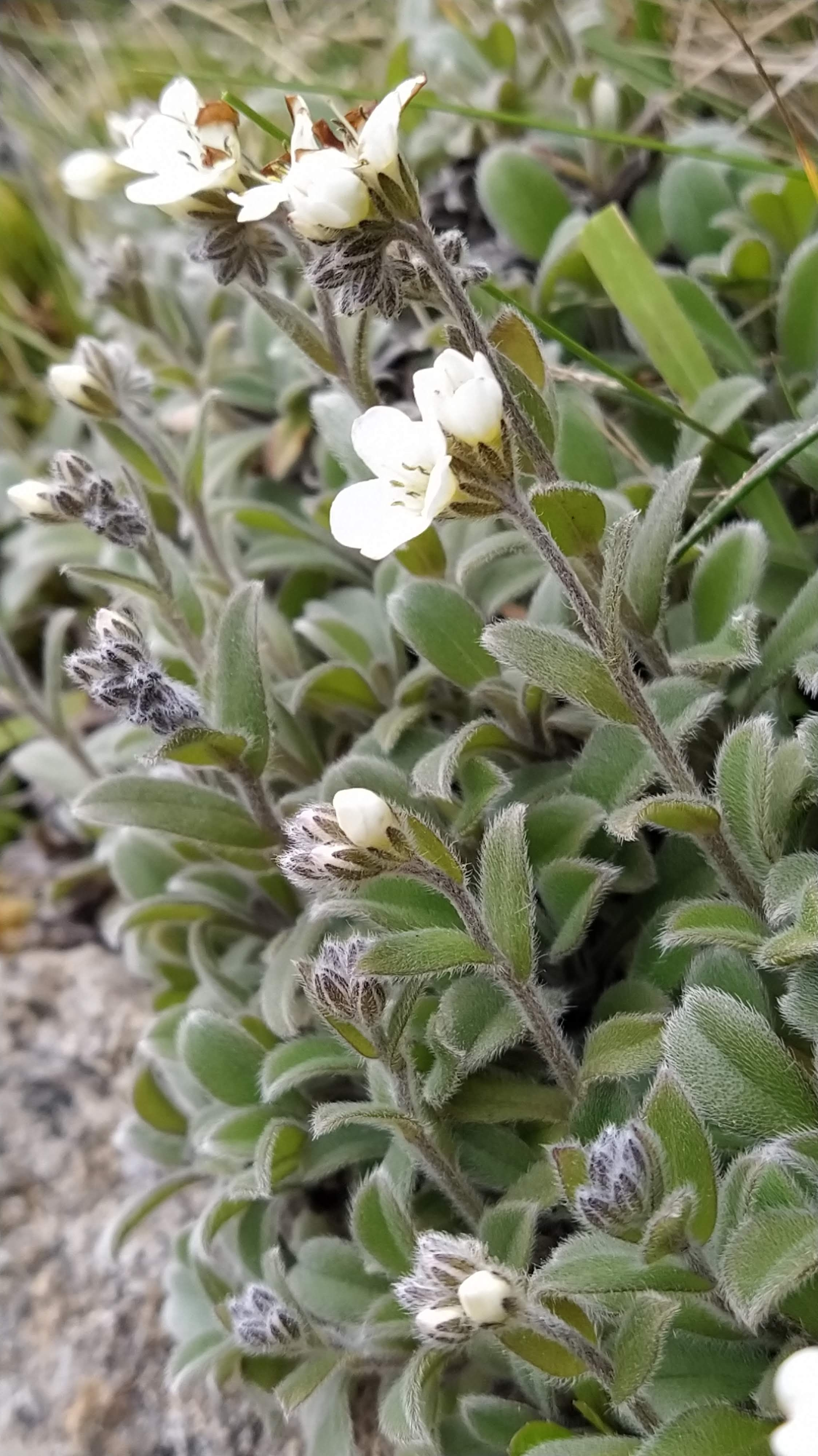
- flowering plants of Myosotis saxosa

Conservation status
- Nationally Critical (NZ TCS)

Scientific classification
- Kingdom: Plantae
- Clade: Tracheophytes
- Clade: Angiosperms
- Clade: Eudicots
- Clade: Asterids
- Order: Boraginales
- Family: Boraginaceae
- Genus: Myosotis
- Species: M. saxosa

Binomial name
- Myosotis saxosa Hook.f.

= Myosotis saxosa =

Species of flowering plant

Myosotis saxosa is a species of flowering plant in the family Boraginaceae, endemic to the North Island of New Zealand. Joseph Dalton Hooker described the species in 1853. Plants of this species of forget-me-not are perennial rosettes with ebracteate inflorescences and white corollas with stamens that are exserted.

== Taxonomy and etymology ==
Myosotis saxosa Hook.f. is in the plant family Boraginaceae. The species was originally described in 1853 by Joseph Dalton Hooker in Flora Novae-Zelandiae. Hooker transferred it to Exarrhena saxosa (Hook.f.) Hook.f. in 1867 on the basis of its exserted stamens, but this name is a homotypic synonym because that genus is no longer recognised.

The most recent treatment of this species was done by Lucy B. Moore in the Flora of New Zealand.

The type specimen of Myosotis saxosa was collected by William Colenso at Titiokura, Hawkes Bay, North Island, New Zealand, and is lodged at Kew Herbarium (K000787881).

Cheeseman made the following distinction between M. amabilis and M. saxosa:

"Rather stout, 3–9 in. high. Leaves 1–2½ in., linear-obovate or obovate-spathulate, coriaceous, hispid on both surfaces. Racemes many-flowered. Flowers large, white, ½ in. diam.........17. M. amabilis Small, stout, 2–3 in. high. Leaves ½–¾ |in., oblong-spathulate, hispid and hoary on both surfaces. Racemes few flowered. Flowers small . . . . . . . . 18. M. saxosa."

Some sources consider M. amabilis to be a synonym of M. saxosa, whereas others recognise two distinct species. Whether M. amabilis and M. saxosa are one species or two is an outstanding taxonomic question that requires further study.

== Phylogeny ==
Myosotis saxosa was shown to be a part of the monophyletic southern hemisphere lineage of Myosotis in phylogenetic analyses of standard DNA sequencing markers (nuclear ribosomal DNA and chloroplast DNA regions) of New Zealand Myosotis. Within the southern hemisphere lineage, species relationships were not well resolved. The three individuals of M. saxosa sampled from the Maungaharuru Range that were included in the study were monophyletic or closely related, and grouped with other North Island species of Myosotis.

== Description ==
Myosotis saxosa plants are rosettes. The rosette leaves have petioles that are about as long as the leaf blades. The rosette leaves are about 20–30 mm long by 5–10 mm wide (length: width ratio c. 2–6: 1), and the leaf blade is broad-ovate to obovate, widest below, at or above the middle, with an apiculate apex. Both surfaces of the leaf are uniformly and sparsely to densely covered in patent to erect hairs. On the upper surface of the leaf, these hairs are always antrorse (forward-facing) whereas on the lower surface, they can be either antrorse or mostly retrorse (backward-facing). Each rosette has several ascending to erect, ebracteate inflorescences that are up to 70 mm long. The cauline leaves are similar to the rosette leaves, but are smaller, elliptic, and subacute to acute, and have hairs similar to the rosette leaves but more appressed. The flowers are about 12 per inflorescence, and each is borne on a short pedicel, without a bract. The calyx is about 5 mm long at flowering and fruiting, lobed to one-half tor more of its length, and densely covered in appressed hairs, as well as some patent hairs, all of which are mostly antrorse. The corolla is white and 7–13 mm in diameter, with a cylindrical tube, and small scales alternating with the petals. The anthers are exserted, surpassing the faucal scales. The nutlets are c. 2.2 mm long by 1.3 mm wide.

The pollen of Myosotis saxosa is unknown.

The chromosome number of M. saxosa is 2n = 22.

Flowering November–Jan and fruiting November–March.

== Distribution and habitat ==
Myosotis saxosa is a forget-me-not originally collected from Titiokura, Hawkes Bay, North Island, New Zealand. Some specimens collected in other areas Hawkes Bay, East Cape (Hikurangi) and even on the South Island have been variously identified as M. amabilis or M. saxosa, and the two species require taxonomic revision. Recent efforts to relocate plants at some North Island localities have been unsuccessful.

== Conservation status ==
Myosotis saxosa is listed as Threatened – Nationally Critical" with the qualifiers Data Poor (DP), Range Restricted (RR), Sparse (Sp) and Stable (St) on the most recent assessment (2017-2018) under the New Zealand Threatened Classification system for plants.

== Gallery ==
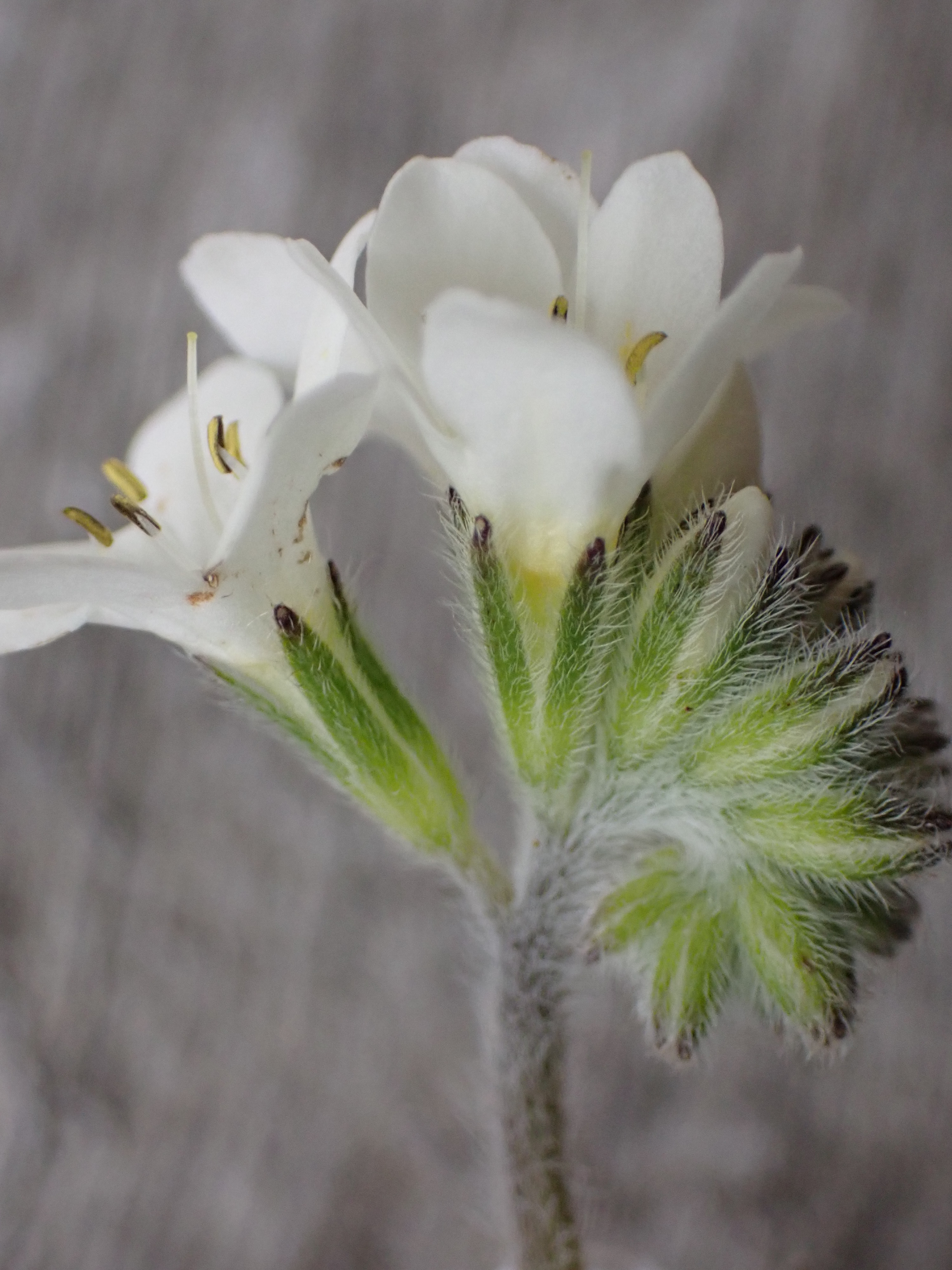

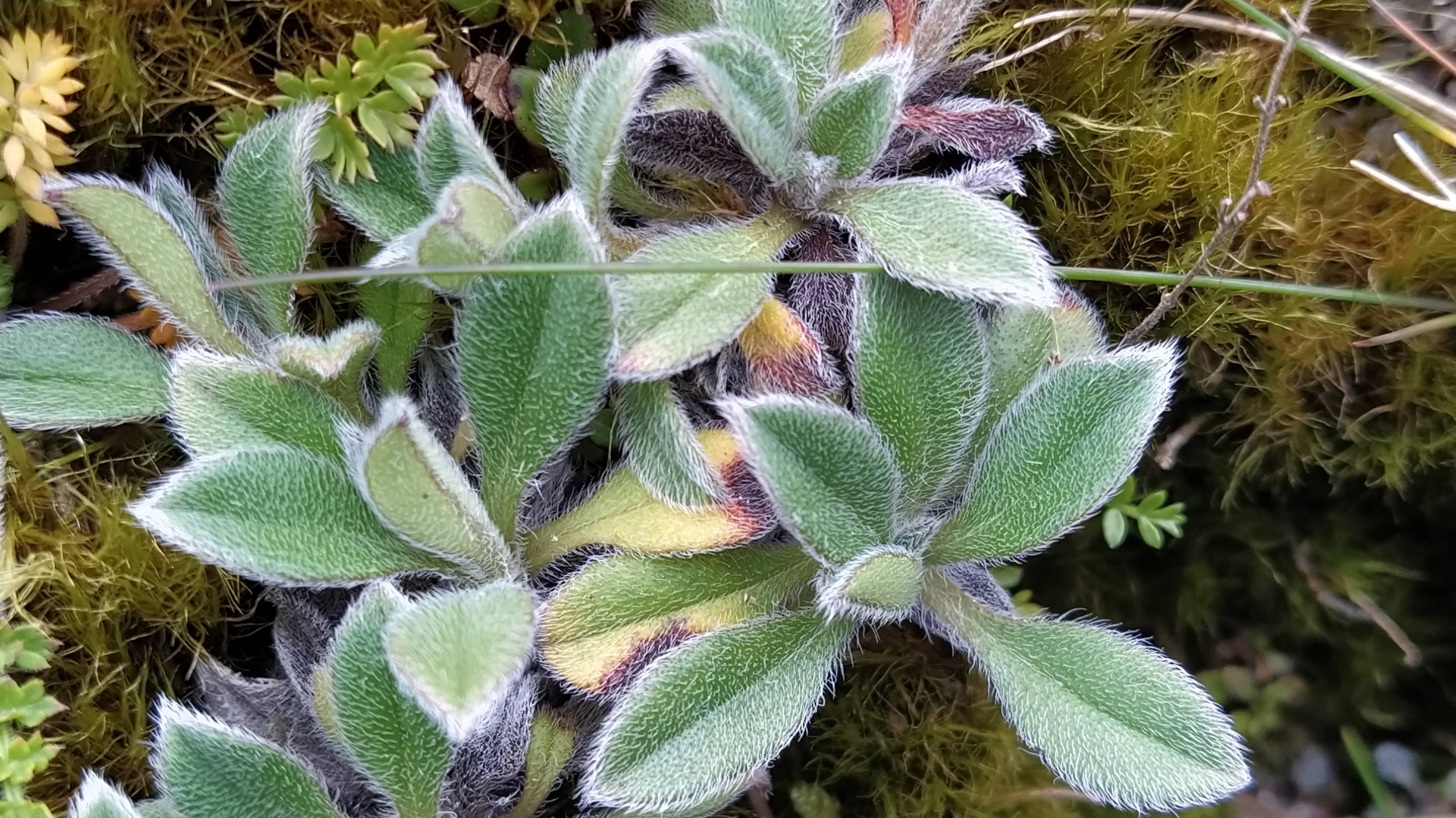

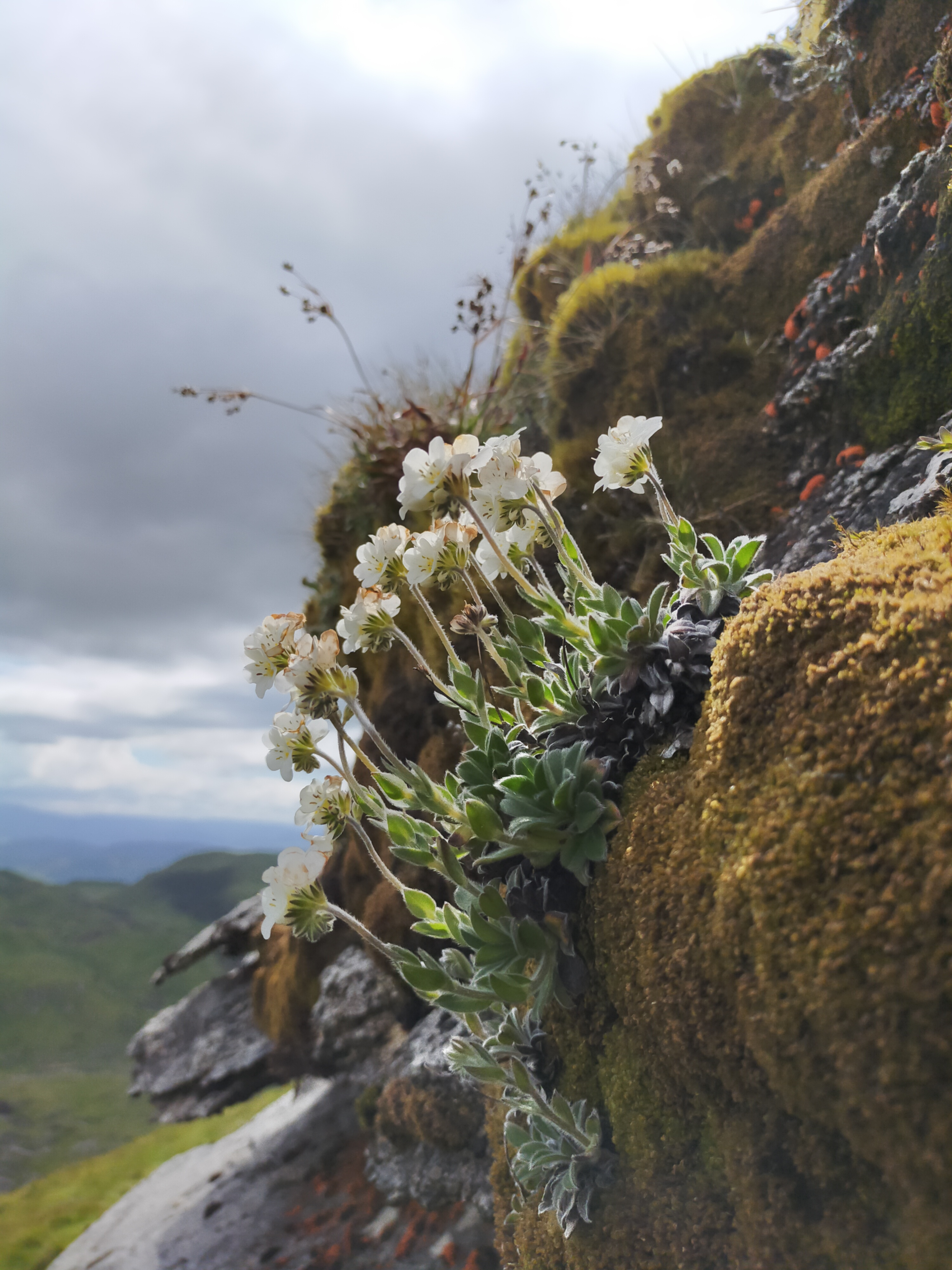

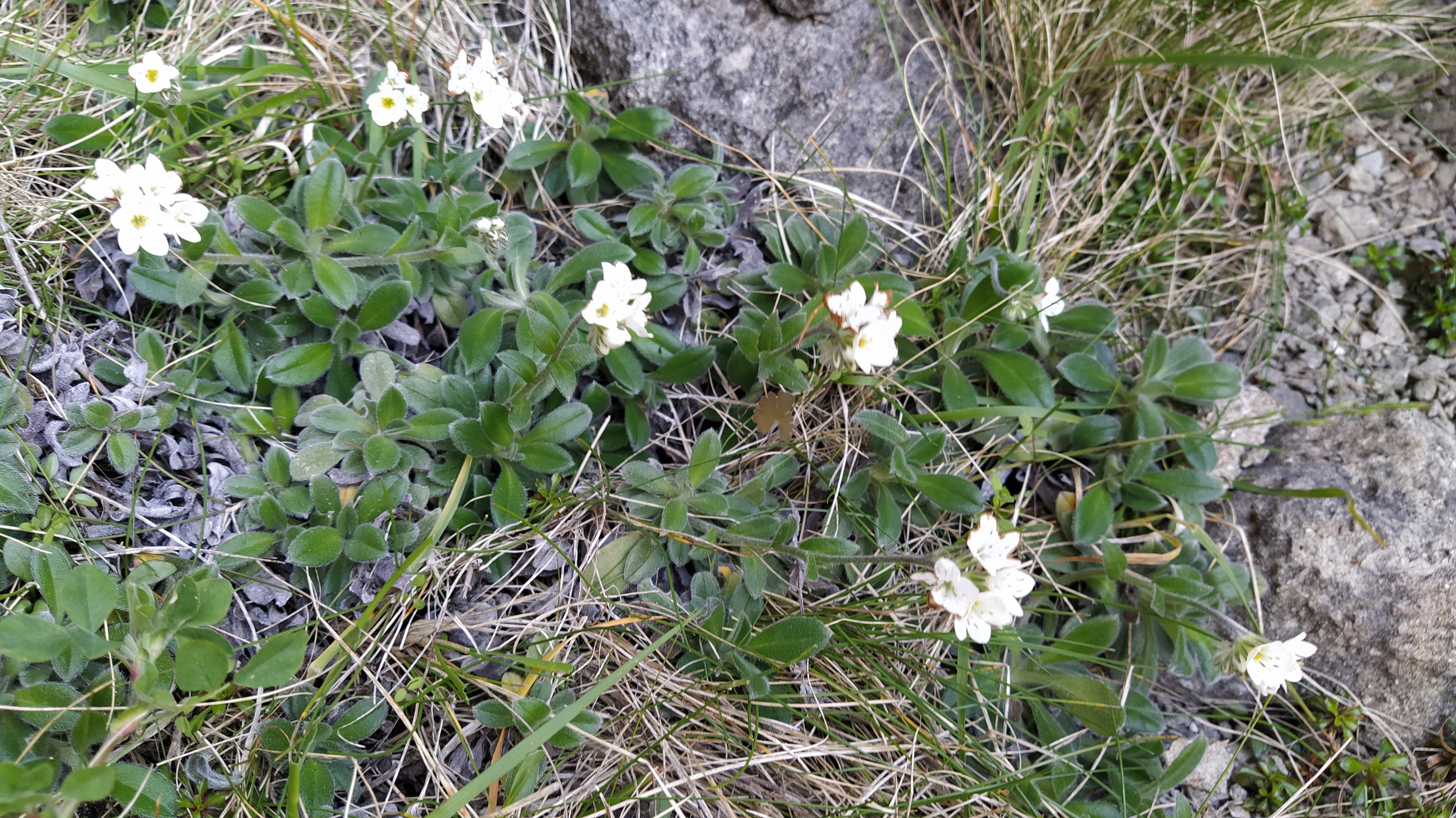
