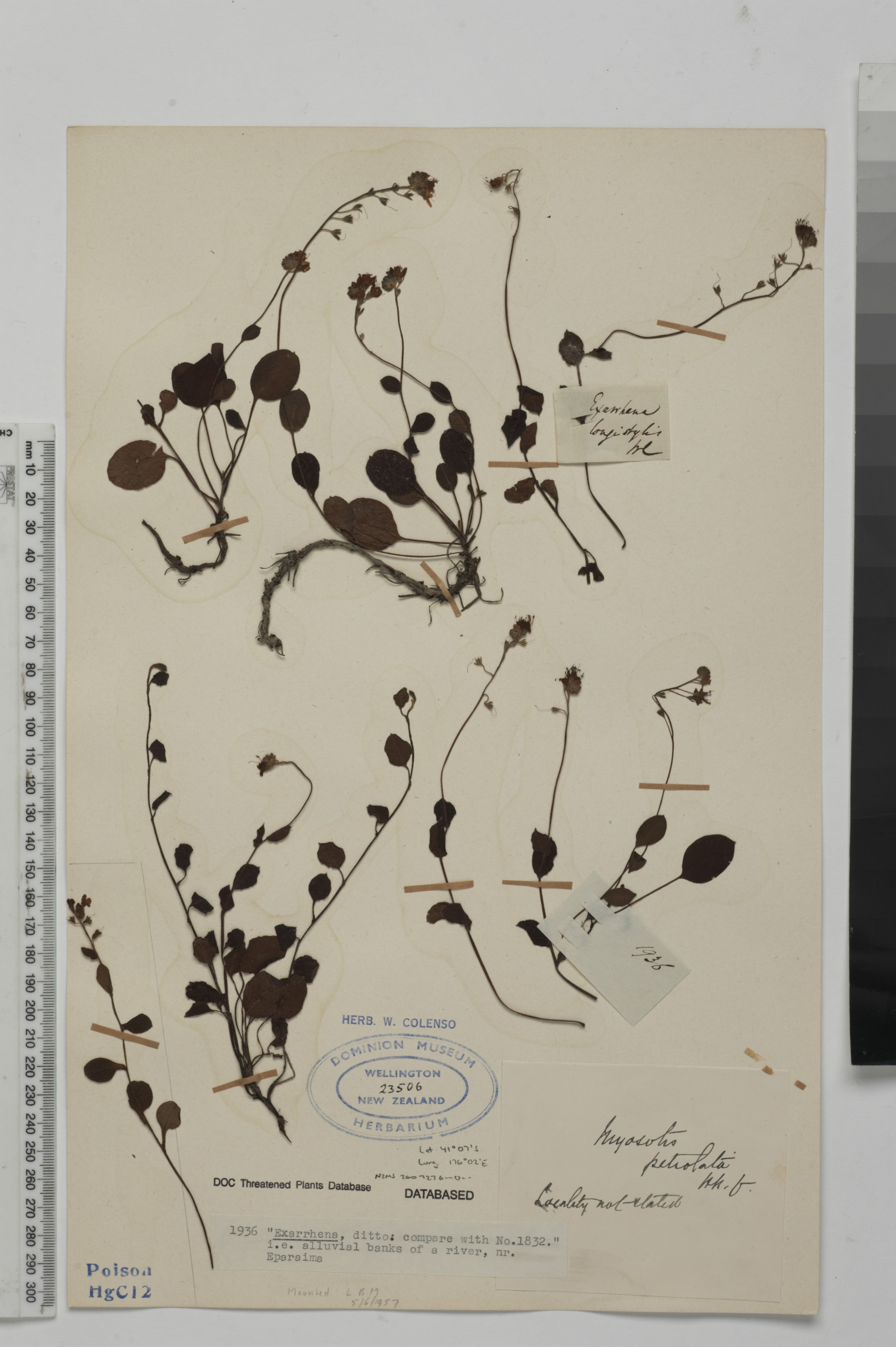
- Type specimen of M. petiolata

Conservation status
- Nationally Critical (NZ TCS)

Scientific classification
- Kingdom: Plantae
- Clade: Tracheophytes
- Clade: Angiosperms
- Clade: Eudicots
- Clade: Asterids
- Order: Boraginales
- Family: Boraginaceae
- Genus: Myosotis
- Species: M. petiolata

Binomial name
- Myosotis petiolata Hook.f.

= Myosotis petiolata =

Species of flowering plant

Myosotis petiolata is a species of flowering plant in the family Boraginaceae, endemic to the Hawkes Bay region of the North Island of New Zealand. Joseph Dalton Hooker described the species in 1853. Plants of this species of forget-me-not are perennial rosettes with ebracteate inflorescences and white corollas with exserted stamens.

== Taxonomy and etymology ==
Myosotis petiolata is in the plant family Boraginaceae. The species was described by Joseph Dalton Hooker in 1853 in Flora Novae-Zelandiae.

The lectotype specimen of Myosotis petiolata was collected by William Colenso, and the isolectotype is lodged at the herbarium of the Museum of New Zealand, Te Papa Tongarewa (WELT SP023506).

The leaves of M. petiolata are petiolate, i.e. they have a petiole, which may refer to the species epithet, petiolata.

Myosotis petiolata is morphologically and genetically most similar to M. pansa and M. pottsiana. These three species are allopatric in their geographic distributions and can be distinguished from one another by a suite of characters that includes corolla diameter (M. petiolata: 4.2–10.5 mm; M. pansa: 7.6–14.3 mm; and M. pottsiana: 5.3–9.8 mm).

== Phylogeny ==
To date, no individuals of Myosotis petiolata have been included in phylogenetic analyses of standard DNA sequencing markers (nuclear ribosomal DNA and chloroplast DNA regions).

However, two to three individuals of Myosotis petiolata were included in two different studies that phylogenetically analysed amplified fragment length polymorphisms (AFLPs) of the informal M. petiolata species group. In these analyses, Myosotis petiolata was genetically differentiated from M. pansa and M. pottsiana. In addition, about 70% of the genetic variation was partitioned within the populations rather than among them (30%).

Three individuals from one population of M. petiolata were also genotyped in a study that developed microsatellite DNA markers for another species group of New Zealand Myosotis. The individuals of M. petiolata included had low genetic diversity.

== Description ==
Myosotis petiolata plants are rosettes. The rosette leaves have petioles that are 8–68 mm long. The rosette leaf blades are 3–35 mm long by 2–24 mm wide (length: width ratio 1.1–2.0: 1), usually narrowly obovate, obovate, broadly obovate, widest at or above the middle, with an obtuse and mucronate apex. Both surfaces of the leaf are uniformly and densely covered in straight, appressed, antrorse (forward-facing) hairs. Each rosette has multiple ascending, unbranched or sometimes once-branched ebracteate inflorescences that are up to 470 mm long. The cauline leaves are similar to the rosette leaves, but become smaller. The flowers are 8–35 per inflorescence and each is borne on a short pedicel without a bract. The calyx is 2–4 mm long at flowering and 3–5 mm long at fruiting, lobed to about three-quarters of its length, and densely covered in straight to curved, appressed to patent, antrorse hairs. The corolla is white and 5–10 mm in diameter, with a cylindrical tube, petals that are narrowly to broadly obovate or narrowly to broadly ovate, and small yellow scales alternating with the petals. The anthers are fully exserted. The four smooth, shiny, usually light to medium brown nutlets are 1.3–1.7 mm long by 0.8–1.0 mm wide and ovoid to broadly ovoid in shape.

The pollen of Myosotis petiolata is unknown.

The chromosome number of M. petiolata is unknown; an individual from the South Island previously identified as M. petiolata has a chromosome number of 2n = 36, but South Island plants were excluded from Myosotis petiolata based on morphological and AFLP data.

== Distribution and habitat ==
Myosotis petiolata is currently only known to occur in the Te Waka Range, North Island, New Zealand in the Hawkes Bay region, at c. 900 m ASL, on limestone cliffs and bluffs. It was previously collected in other nearby Hawkes Bay localities.

== Conservation status ==
Myosotis petiolata is listed as Threatened - Nationally Vulnerable in the most recent assessment (2017-2018) of the New Zealand Threatened Classification for plants. The qualifiers "DP" (Data Poor) and "OL" (One Location) are also attached to the assessment. A collaboration by the Department of Conservation, local iwi, councils and other organisations is propagating the species from cuttings, and as of January 2026 had raised 232 cultivated plants.

Myosotis petiolata was featured on RNZ Critter of the Week as "one of the most endangered plants in the country".

== Gallery ==
Some photos of leaves of cultivated plants.

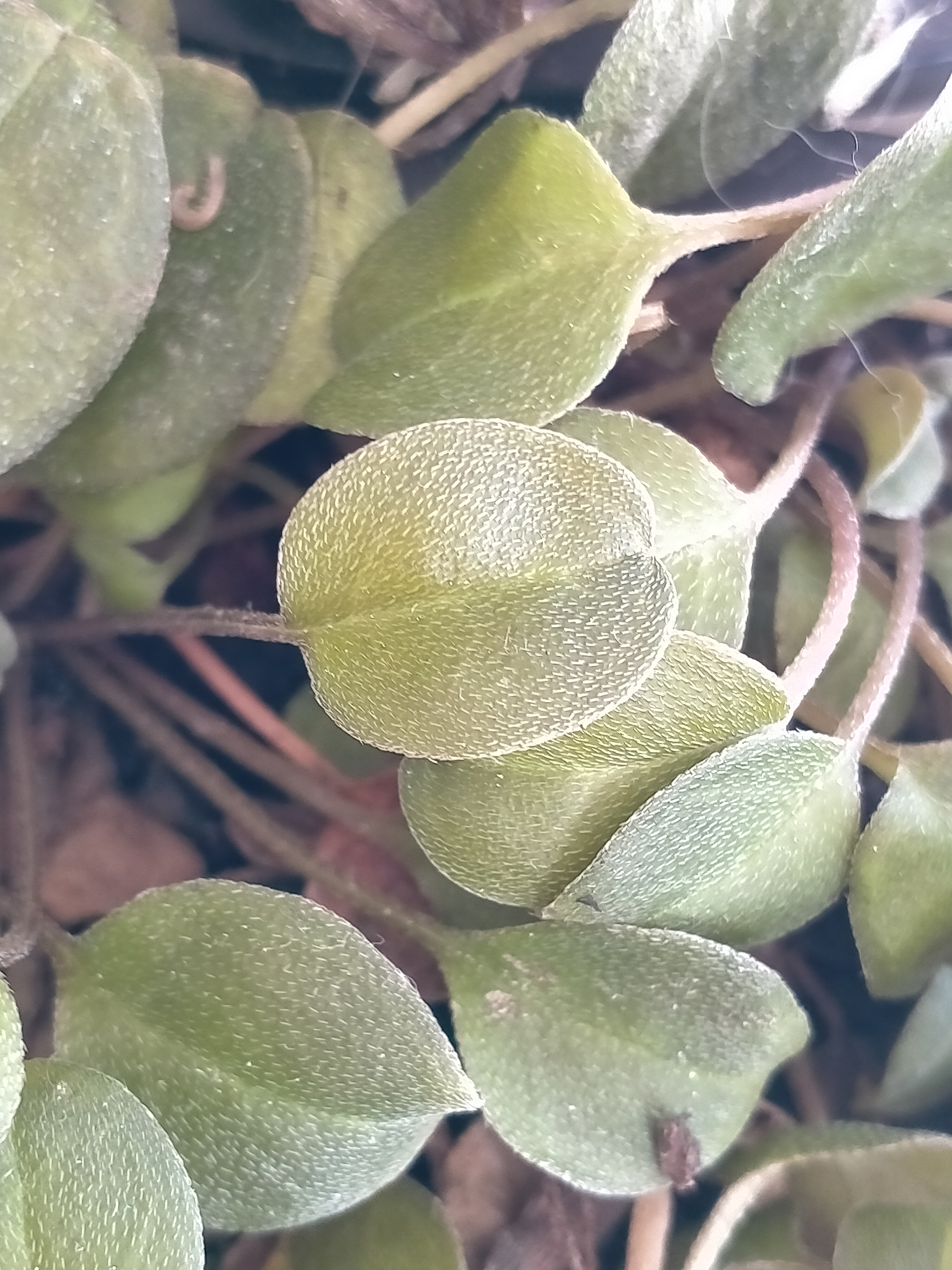

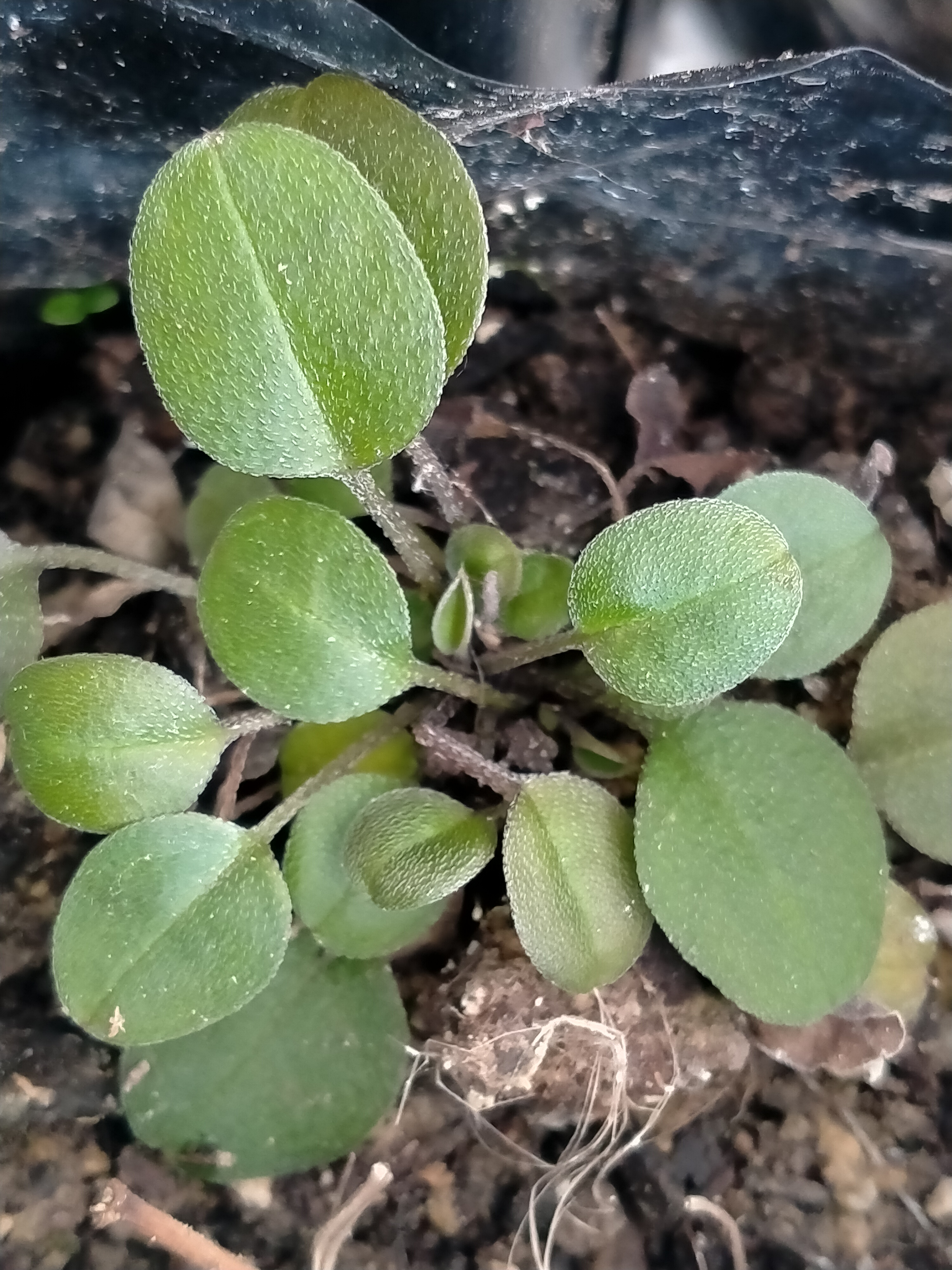

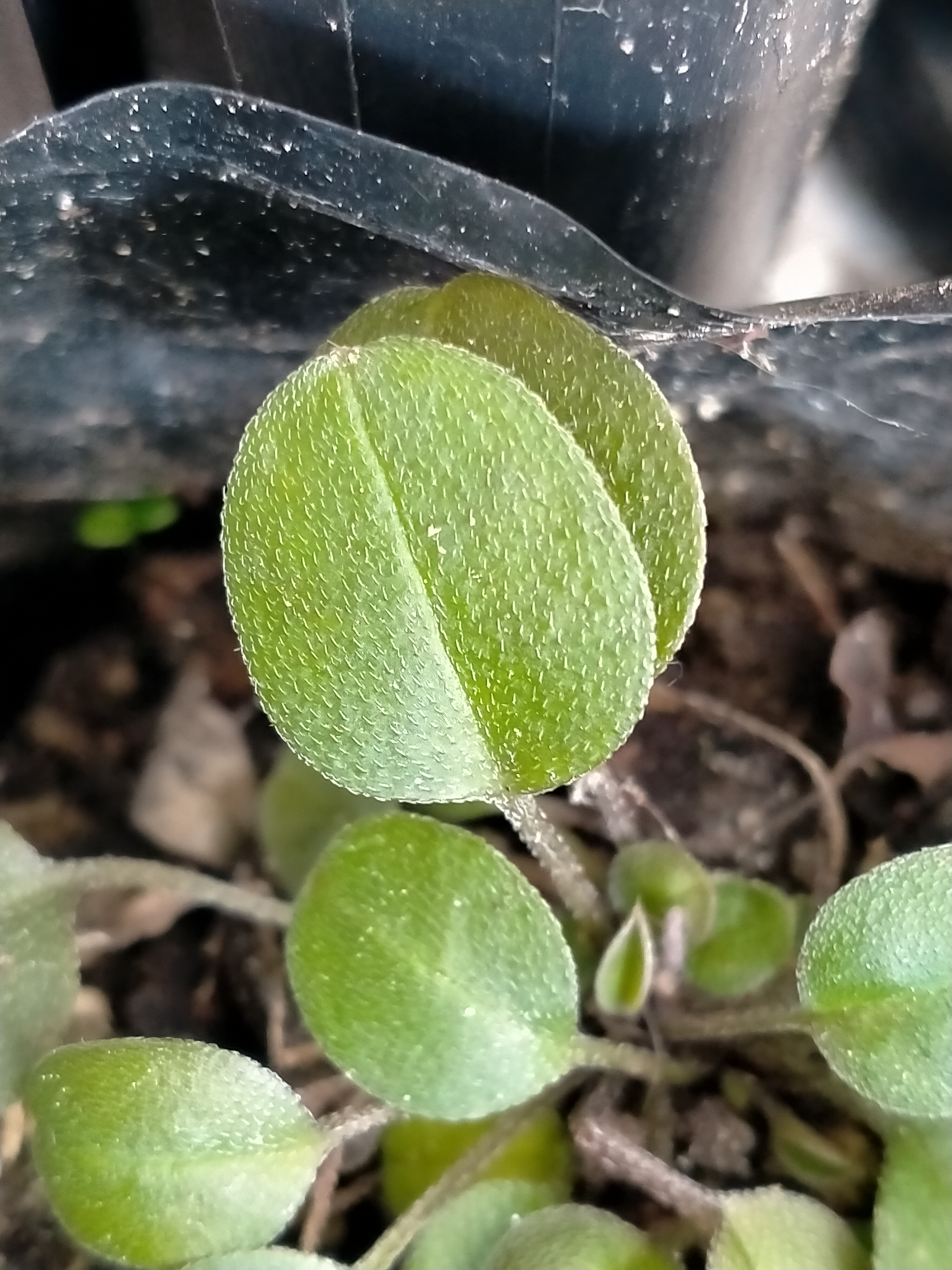

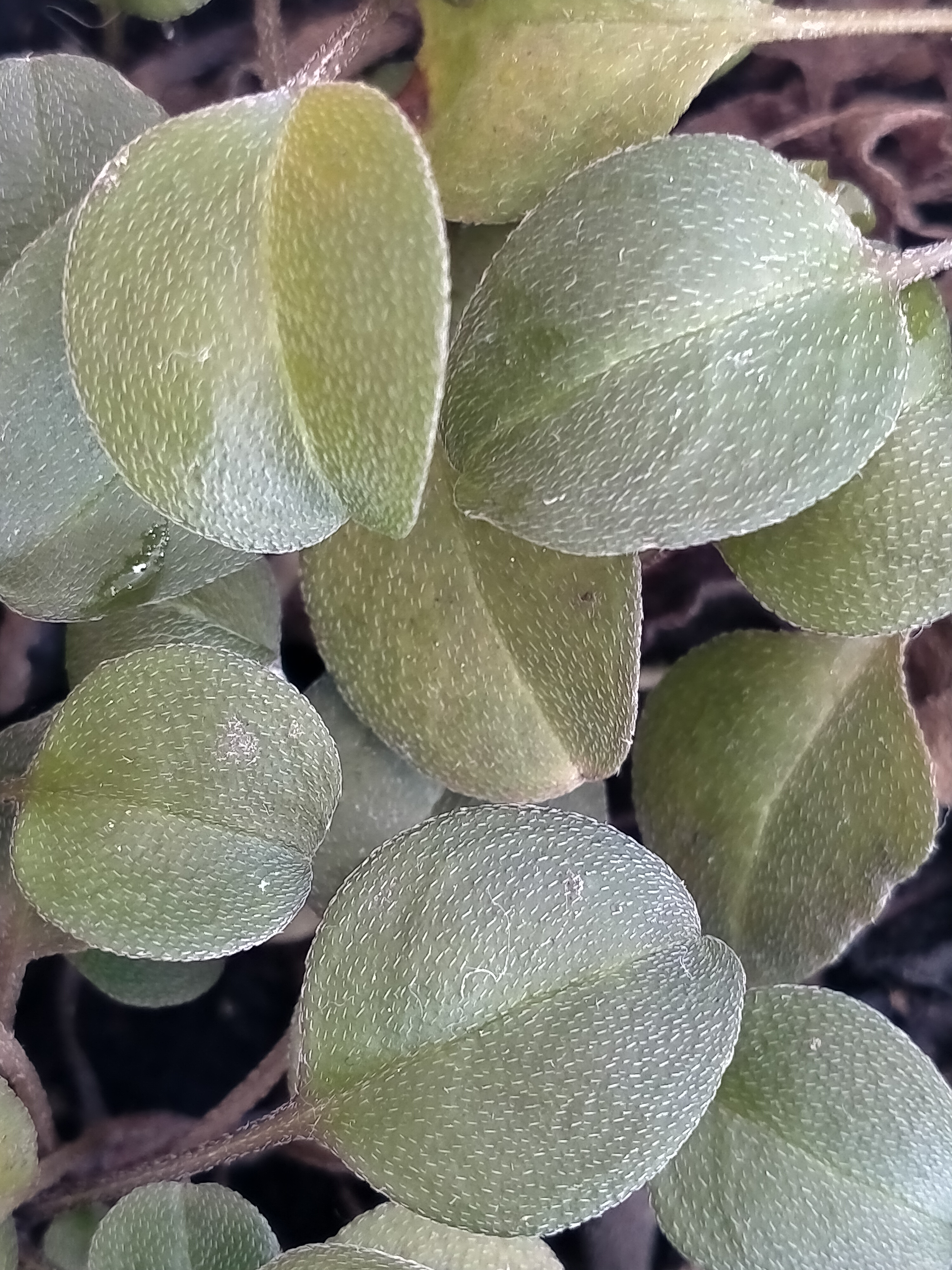
