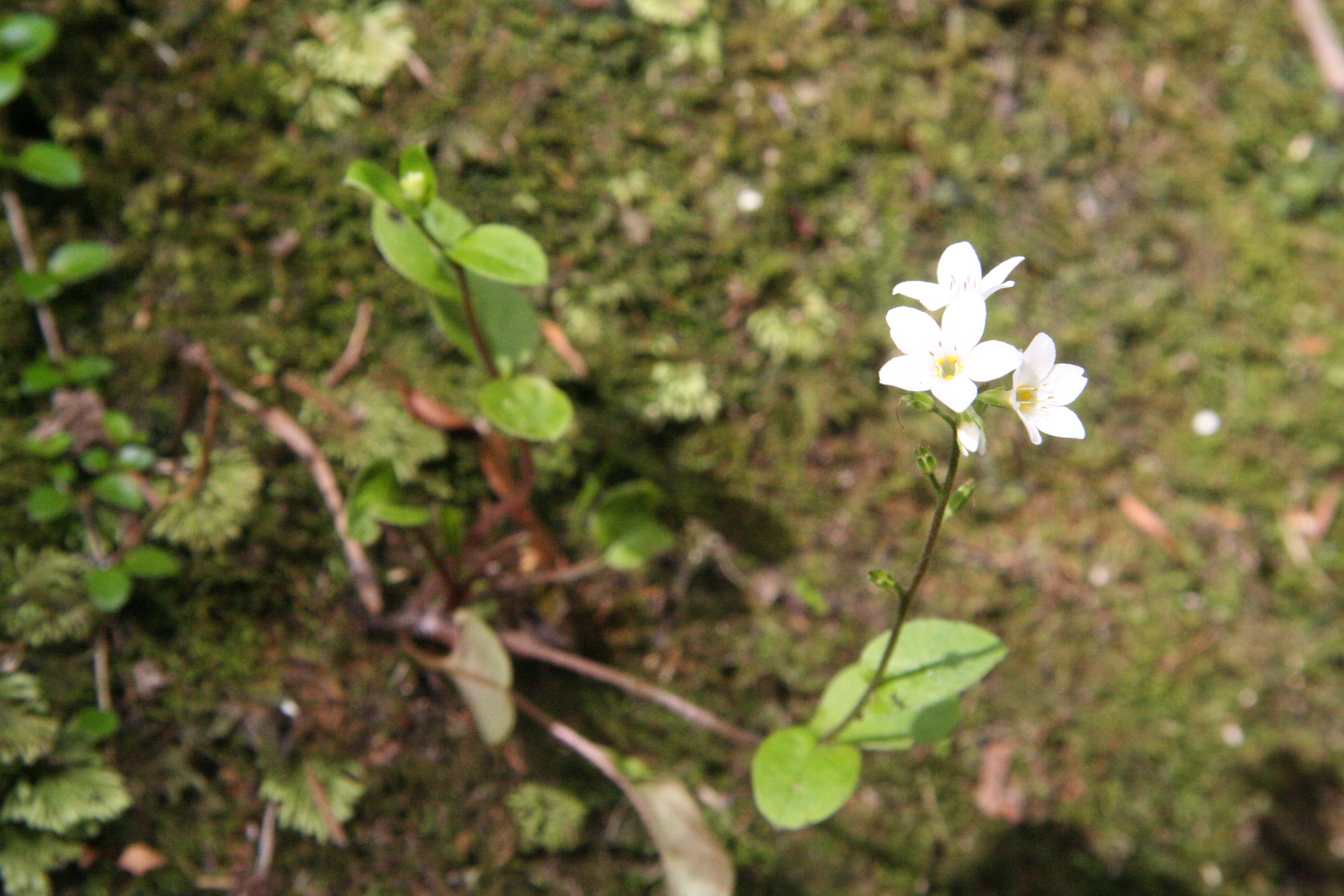
- Habit and flowers of Myosotis pottsiana

Conservation status
- Nationally Critical (NZ TCS)

Scientific classification
- Kingdom: Plantae
- Clade: Embryophytes
- Clade: Tracheophytes
- Clade: Angiosperms
- Clade: Eudicots
- Clade: Asterids
- Order: Boraginales
- Family: Boraginaceae
- Genus: Myosotis
- Species: M. pottsiana

Binomial name
- Myosotis pottsiana (L.B.Moore) Meudt et al.

Synonyms
- Myosotis petiolata var. pottsiana L.B.Moore

= Myosotis pottsiana =

Species of flowering plant

Myosotis pottsiana is a species of flowering plant in the family Boraginaceae, endemic to the North Island of New Zealand. Lucy Moore described Myosotis petiolata var. pottsiana in 1961. Plants of this species of forget-me-not are perennial rosettes with ebracteate inflorescences and white corollas with exserted stamens.

== Taxonomy and etymology ==
Myosotis pottsiana (L.B.Moore) Meudt, Prebble, R.J.Stanley & Thorsen is in the plant family Boraginaceae. The species was originally described by Lucy Moore as a variety of M. pansa, Myosotis petiolata var. pottsiana in 1961. It was raised to species rank by Heidi Meudt, Jessica Prebble, Rebecca Stanley, and Michael Thorsen in 2013.

The lectotype specimen of Myosotis petiolata var. pottsiana was collected by Anthony Druce in 1956, and the holotype is lodged at the Allan Herbarium of Manaaki Whenua - Landcare Research (CHR 87624).

Myosotis pottsiana was discovered by Norman Potts and Marc Heginbotham around 1952, and the variety and now species epithet honours Potts, who also collected and cultivated it.

Myosotis pottsiana is morphologically and genetically most similar to M. pansa and M. petiolata. These three species are allopatric in their geographic distributions, and can be distinguished from one another by a suite of characters that includes corolla diameter (M. pottsiana: 5.3–9.8 mm; M. petiolata: 4.2–10.5 mm; and M. pansa: 7.6–14.3 mm).

== Phylogeny ==
Two individuals of Myosotis pottsiana have been included in phylogenetic analyses of standard DNA sequencing markers (nuclear ribosomal DNA and chloroplast DNA regions).

In addition, several individuals of Myosotis pottsiana were included in two different studies that phylogenetically analysed amplified fragment length polymorphisms (AFLPs) of the informal M. petiolata species group. In these analyses, Myosotis pottsiana was genetically differentiated from M. pansa and M. petiolata.

== Description ==
Myosotis pottsiana plants are rosettes. The rosette leaves have petioles that are 14–57 mm long. The rosette leaf blades are 7–51 mm long by 5–32 mm wide (length: width ratio 1.2–2.0: 1), usually narrowly obovate, obovate, broadly obovate, widest at or above the middle, with an obtuse and mucronate apex. Both surfaces of the leaf are uniformly and densely covered in straight, appressed, antrorse (forward-facing) hairs. Each rosette has multiple ascending, branched ebracteate (or sometimes partially bracteate) inflorescences that are up to 430 mm long. The cauline leaves are similar to the rosette leaves, but become smaller. The flowers are 6–73 per inflorescence, and each is borne on a short pedicel without a bract (or sometimes lowest flowers with a bract). The calyx is 2–4 mm long at flowering and 3–5 mm long at fruiting, lobed to half to three-quarters of its length, and densely covered in straight to curved, appressed to patent, antrorse hairs. The corolla is white and 7–15 mm in diameter, with a cylindrical tube, petals that are narrowly ovate, ovate, obovate or broadly obovate, and small yellow scales alternating with the petals. The anthers are fully exserted. The four smooth, shiny, usually medium to dark brown nutlets are 1.3–1.8 mm long by 0.9–1.2 mm wide and ovoid to broadly ovoid in shape.

The pollen of Myosotis pottsiana is unknown.

The chromosome number of M. pottsiana is 2n = 44.

== Distribution and habitat ==
Although once thought to be extinct, Myosotis pottsiana is known from a handful of populations in Bay of Plenty, North Island, New Zealand from 40 to 300 m ASL, on vertical rock walls, steep river banks and forest bluffs.

== Conservation status ==
Myosotis pottsiana is listed as Threatened - Nationally Critical in the most recent assessment (2023) of the New Zealand Threatened Classification for plants. The qualifiers "EF" (Extreme fluctuations) and "Sp" (Sparse) are also attached to the assessment.

== Gallery ==
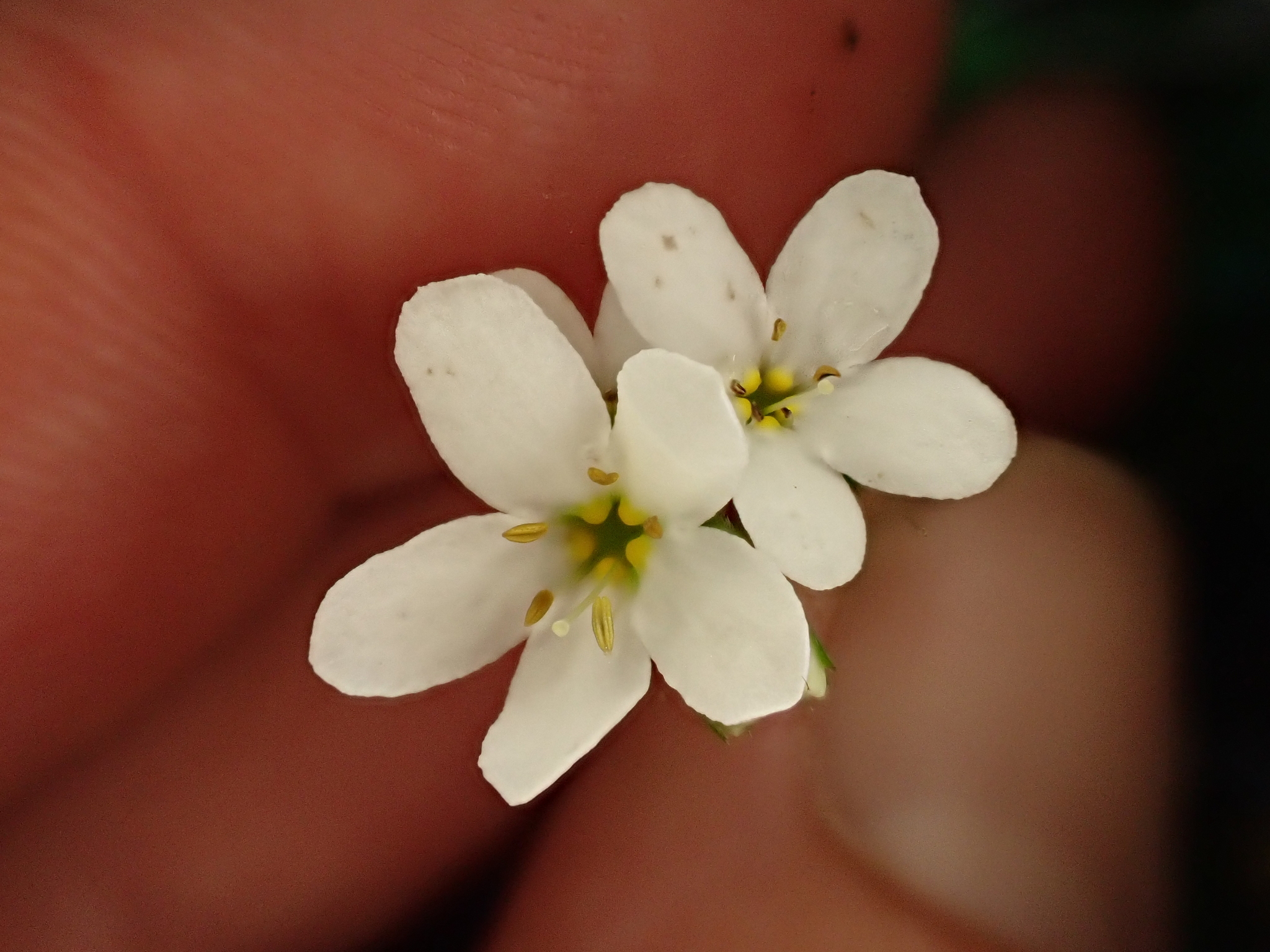
Flowers

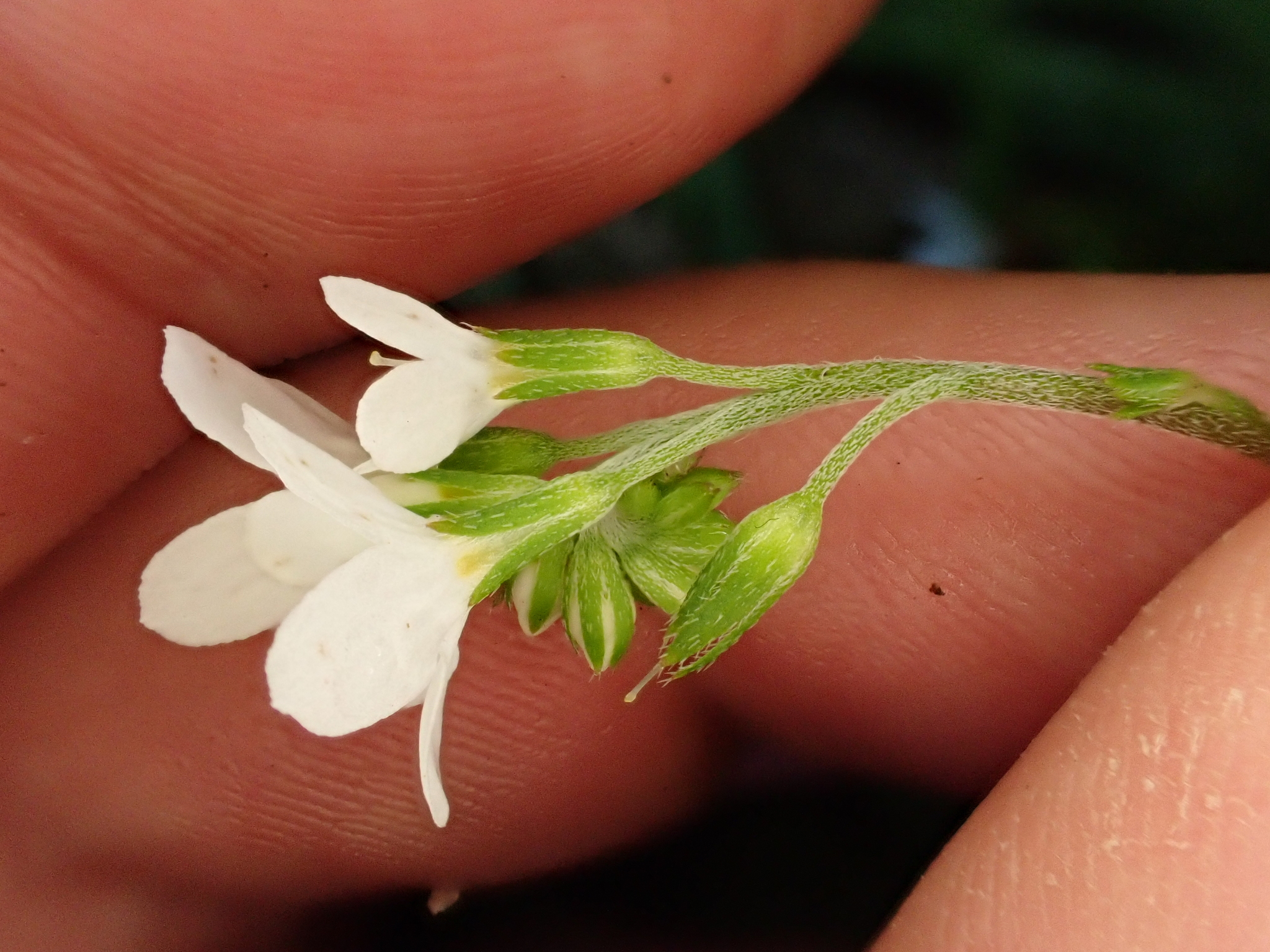
Flowers, side view

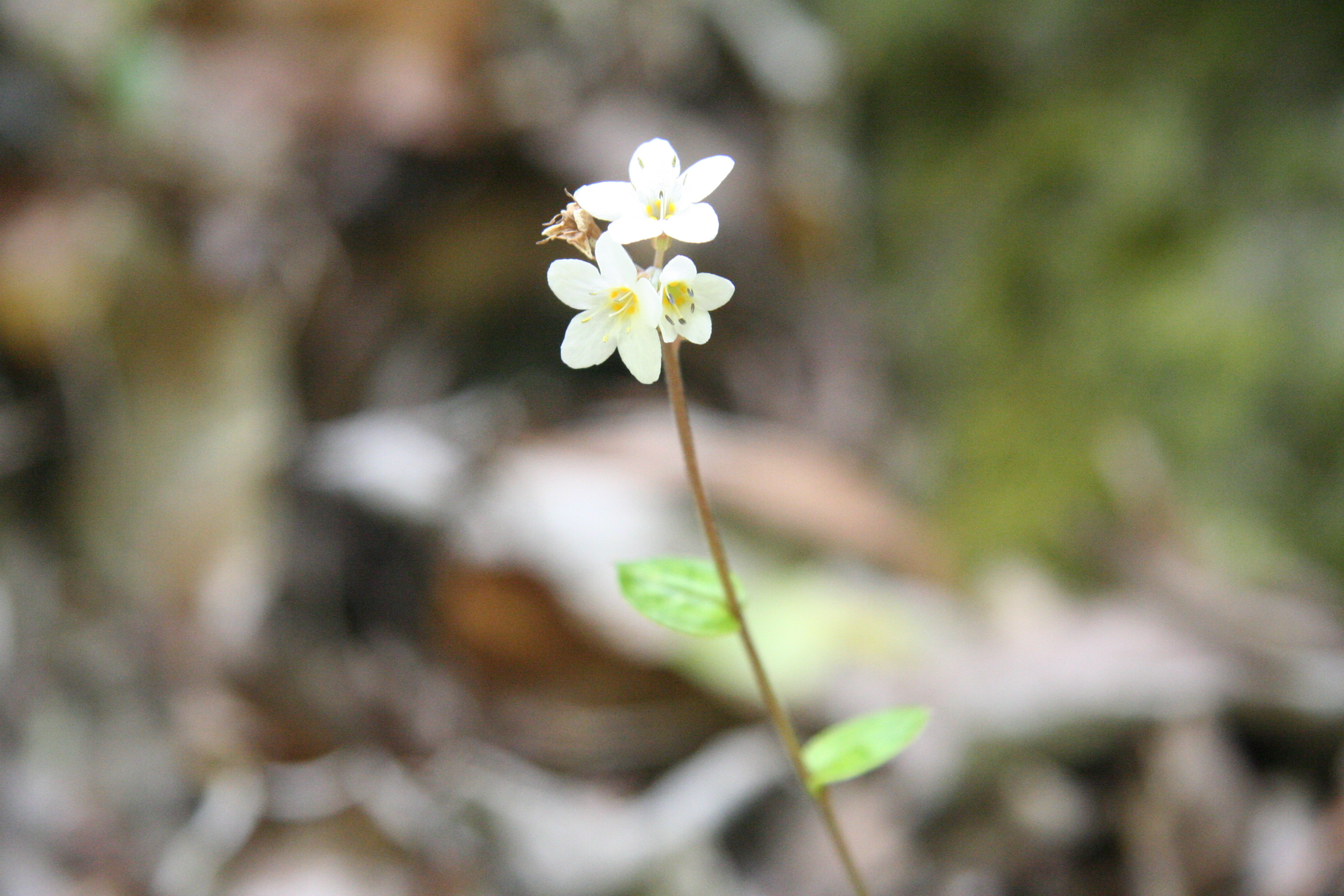
Inflorescence

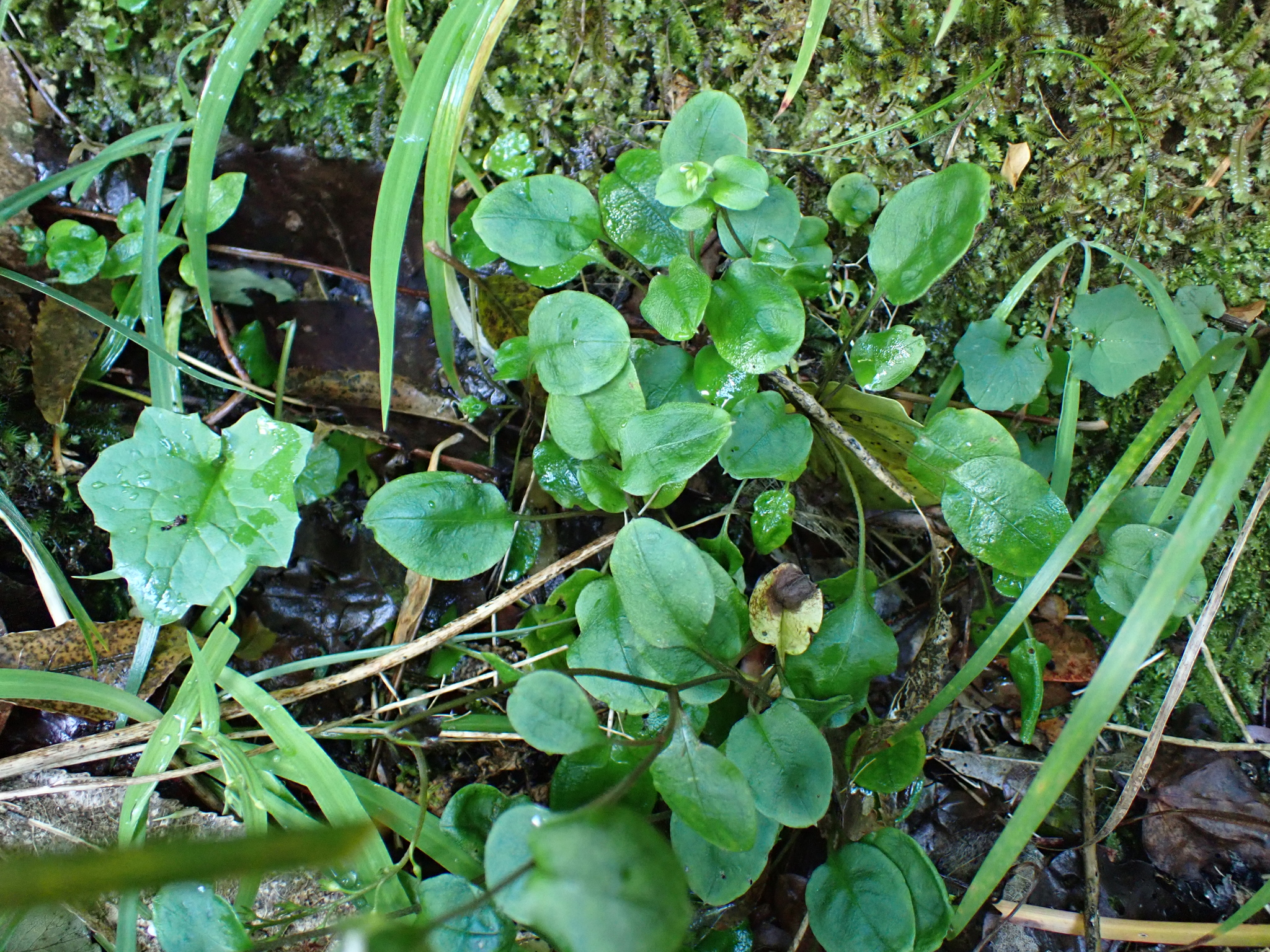
Leaves

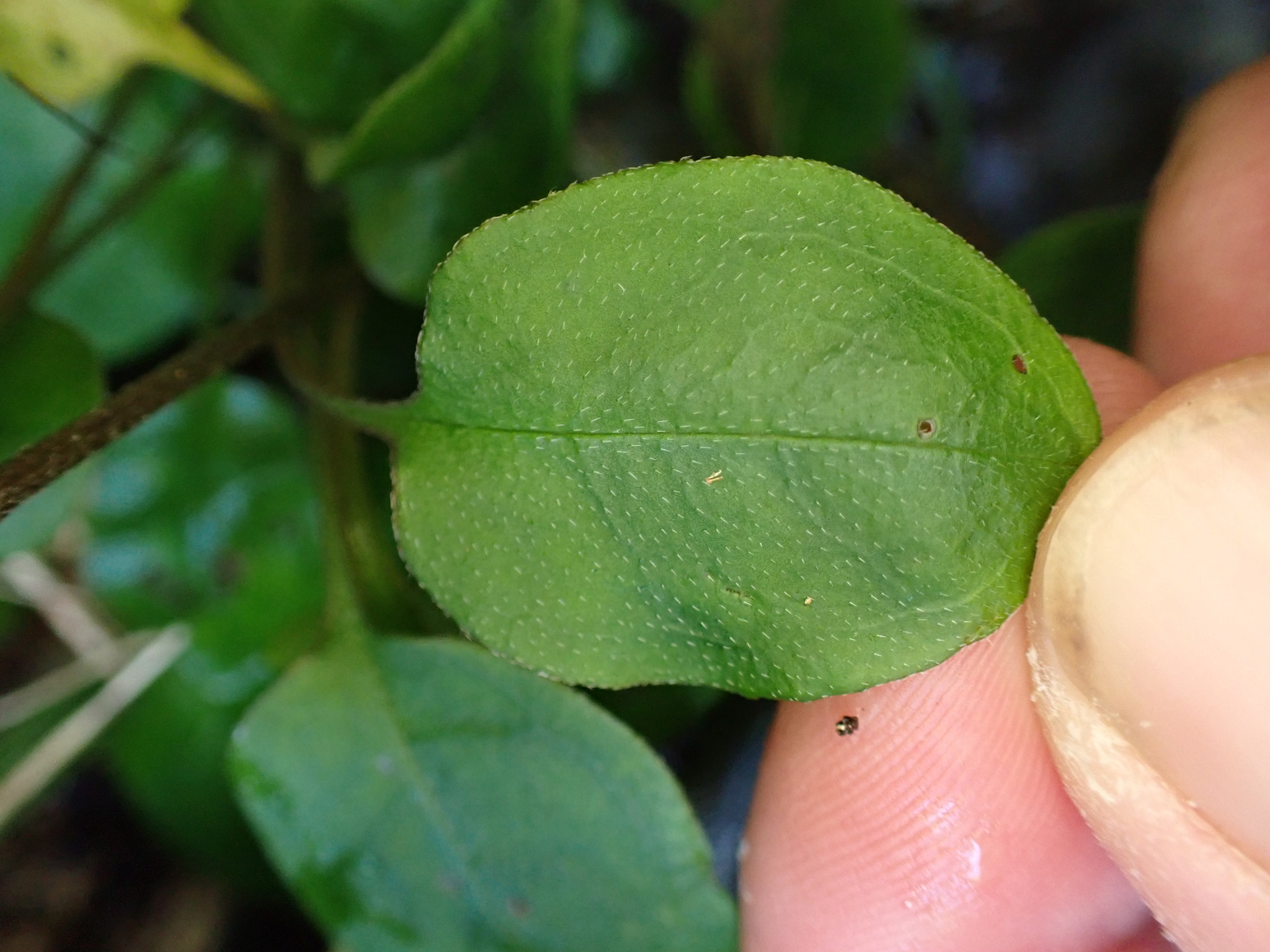
Upper leaf surface, showing straight, appressed hairs

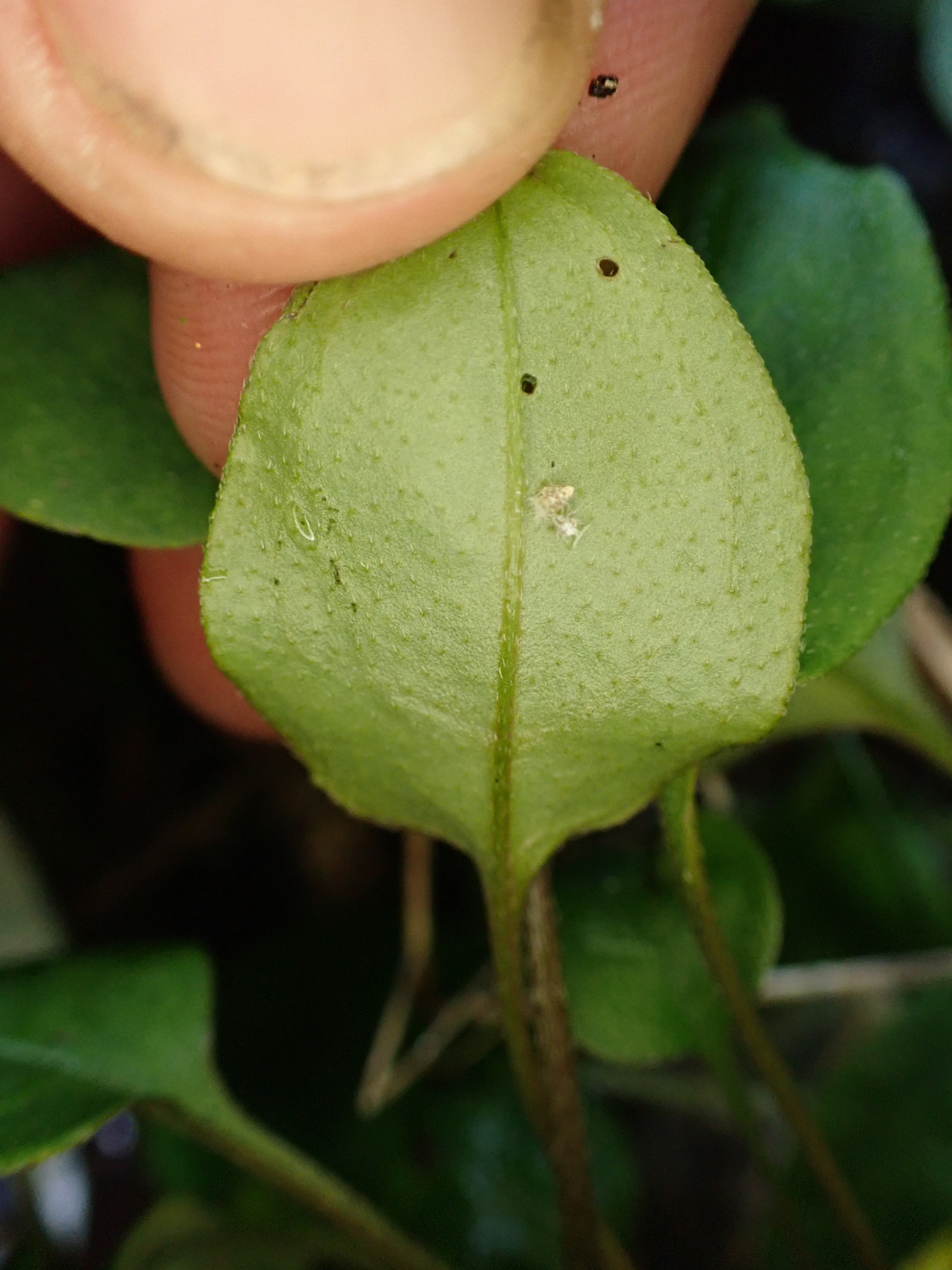
Lower leaf surface

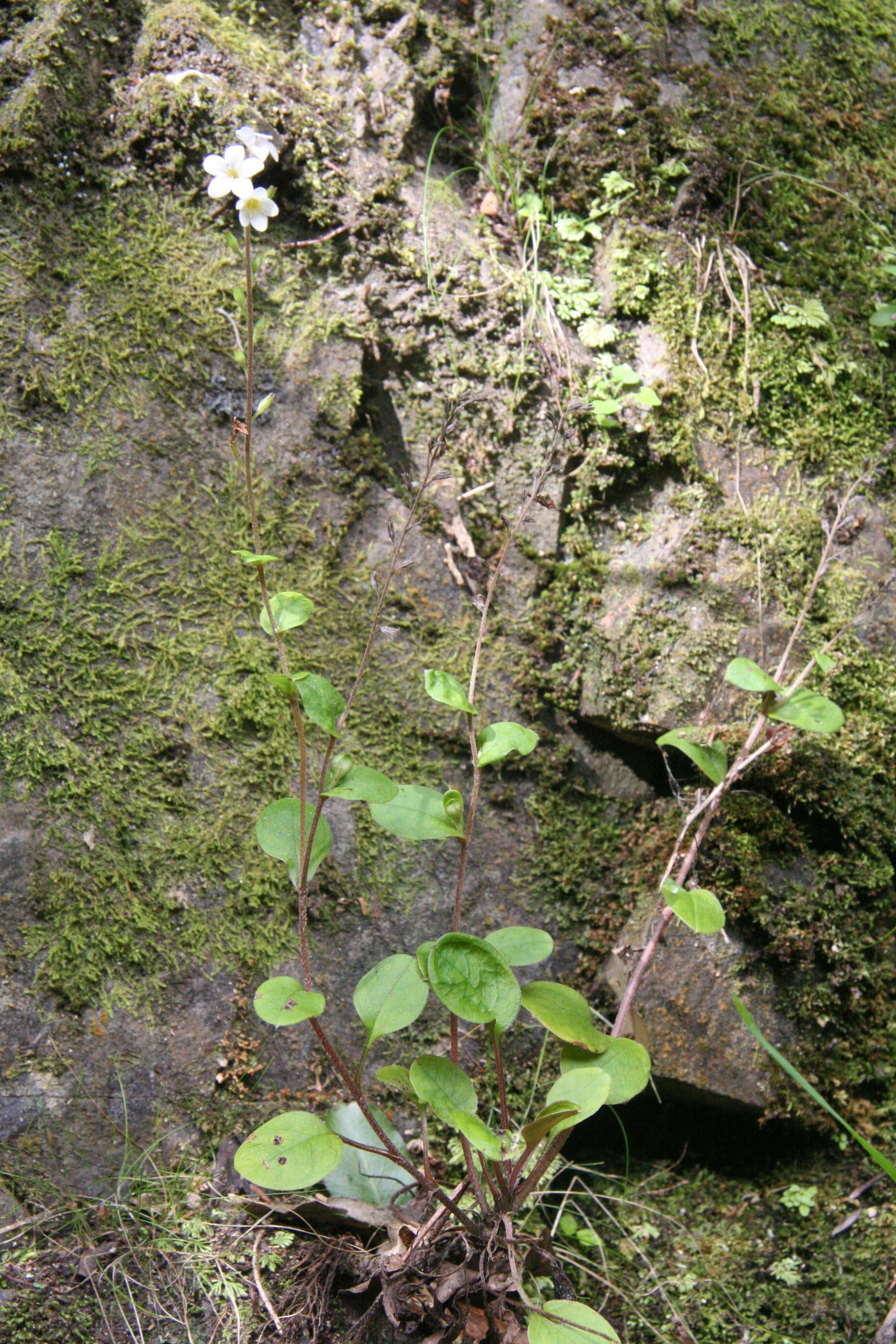
Habit and habitat
