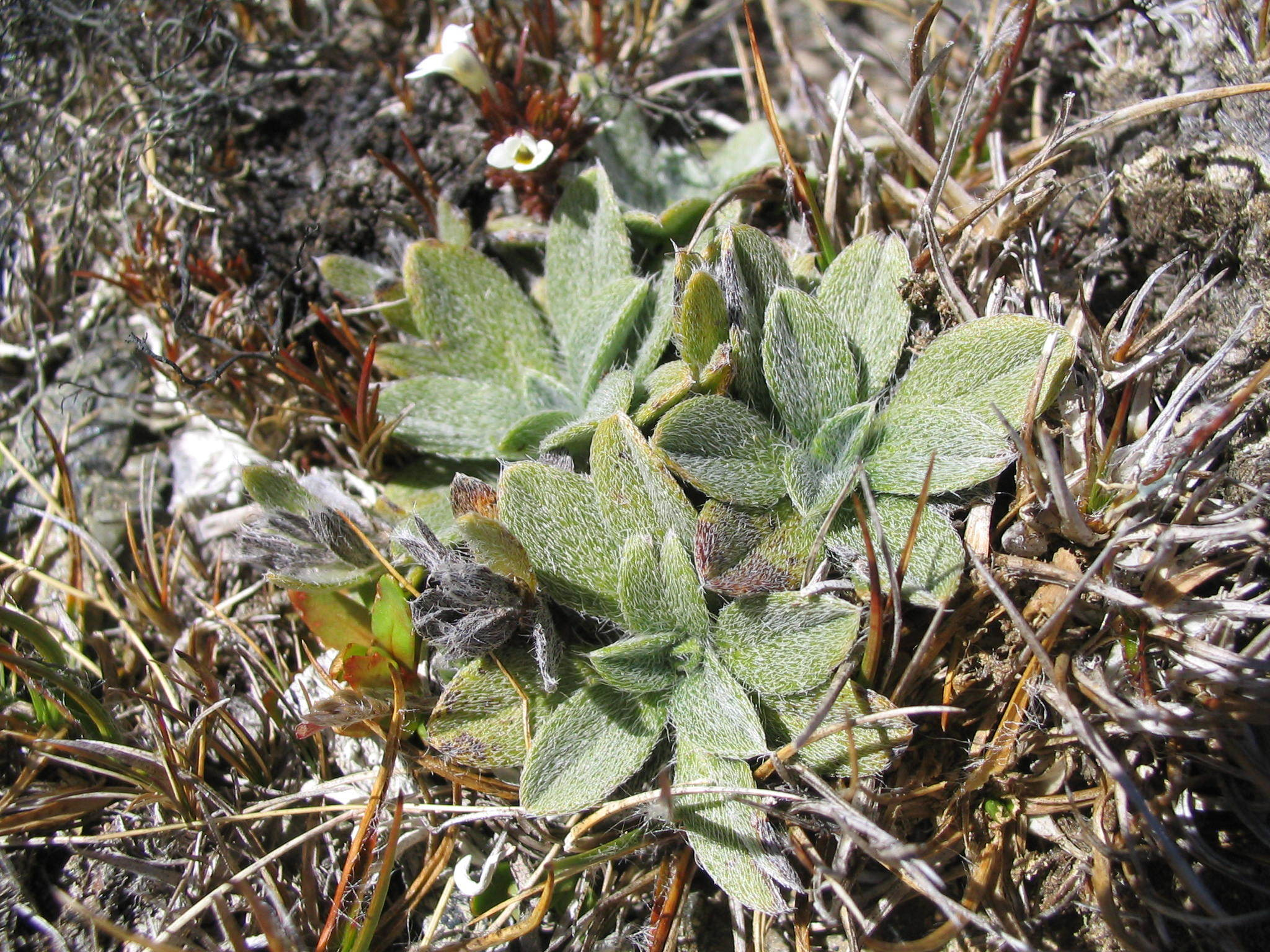
- Habit of Myosotis venticola

Scientific classification
- Kingdom: Plantae
- Clade: Tracheophytes
- Clade: Angiosperms
- Clade: Eudicots
- Clade: Asterids
- Order: Boraginales
- Family: Boraginaceae
- Genus: Myosotis
- Species: M. venticola

Binomial name
- Myosotis venticola Meudt & Prebble, 2022

= Myosotis venticola =

Species of flowering plant

Myosotis venticola is a species of flowering plant in the family Boraginaceae, endemic to the South Island of New Zealand. Heidi Meudt and Jessica Prebble described M. venticola in 2022. Plants of this forget-me-not are perennial with bracteate and prostrate inflorescences, and small, white corollas with partly exserted stamens.

== Taxonomy and etymology ==
Myosotis venticola Meudt & Prebble is in the plant family Boraginaceae. The species was described by Heidi Meudt and Jessica Prebble in 2022. The holotype was collected by A.P. Druce near Dunstan and is lodged at the Allan Herbarium of Manaaki Whenua - Landcare Research (CHR 624106).

The specific epithet, venticola, means ‘‘inhabiting windy areas’ and refers to the high-elevation windswept habitats of this species. It comes from the Latin words ventus (‘wind’) and cola (‘dweller’).

Myosotis venticola has been previously confused with M. cheesemanii. However, morphological comparison of herbarium specimens showed that M. venticola is morphologically most similar to M. lyallii and M. retrorsa. Myosotis venticola has retrorse (backward-facing) hairs mixed with antrorse (forward-facing) hairs on the upper side of the leaves (which is a unique character that can distinguish it from all other southern hemisphere species of Myosotis except M. oreophila) as well as on the lower surface (which can distinguish it from all other species except M. retrorsa and M. umbrosa).

Additionally, the hairs are appressed on the upper surface and margins of the rosette leaves, and together with its unbranched inflorescences, these characters further distinguish Myosotis venticola from M. retrorsa and M. lyallii. Finally, other characters that can help distinguish M. venticola from M. cheesemanii include partially bracteate inflorescences, retrorse hairs on the calyces, and flexuous hairs on the rosette leaves.

== Phylogeny ==
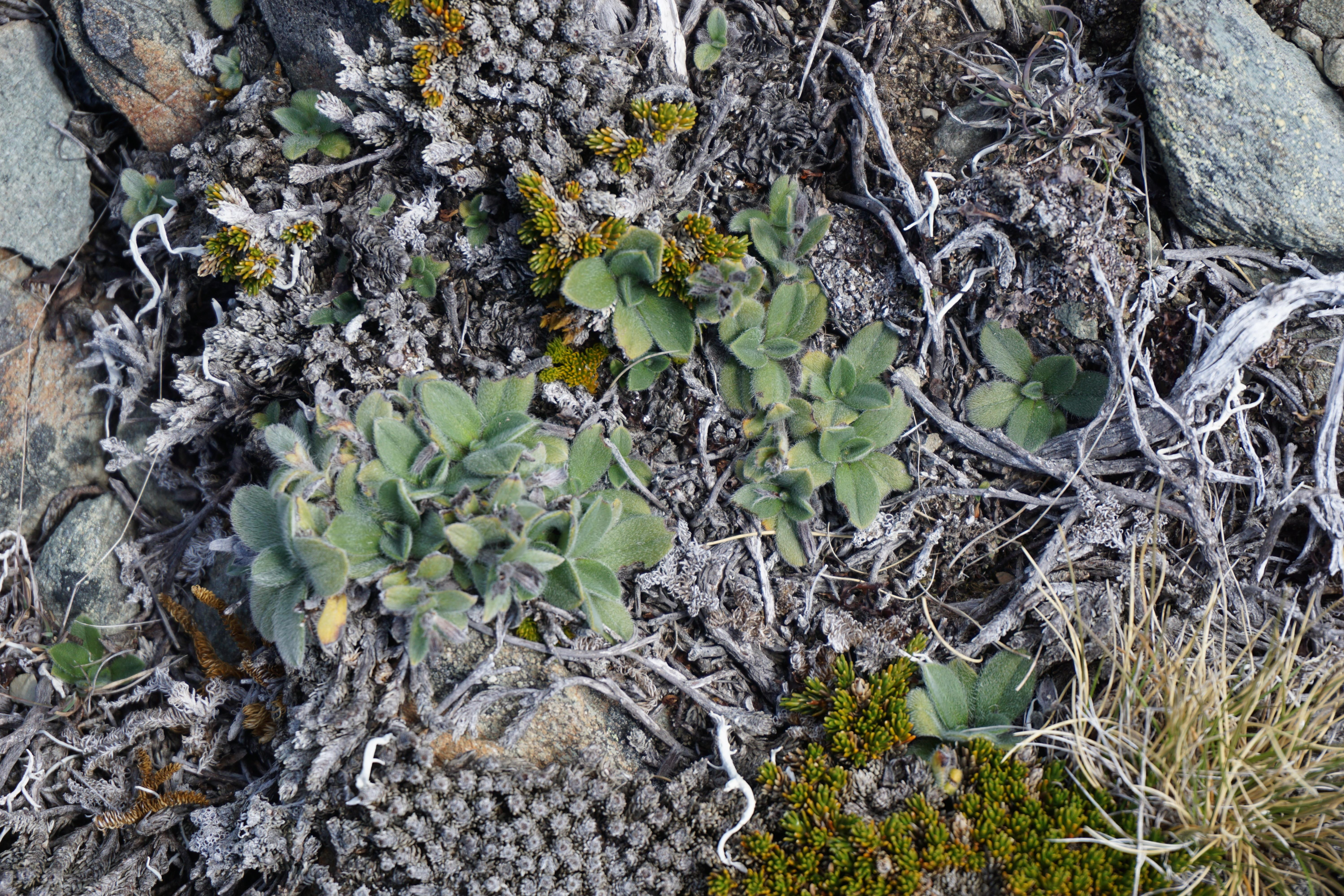
M. venticola in its natural habitat

Myosotis venticola was not included in phylogenetic analyses of standard DNA sequencing markers (nuclear ribosomal DNA and chloroplast DNA regions). Within the southern hemisphere lineage, species relationships were not well resolved.

== Description ==
Myosotis venticola plants are single rosettes that often cluster together to form clumps or mats. The rosette leaves have petioles 2–8 mm long. The rosette leaf blades are 3–12 mm long by 2–7 mm wide (length: width ratio 1.1–2.1: 1), usually narrowly obovate or obovate, and usually widest above the middle (rarely below the middle), with an obtuse apex. The upper surface of the leaf is densely covered in mostly flexuous (some straight), appressed or patent antrorse (forward-facing) hairs that are mixed with some retrorse (backward-facing) hairs, and oriented mostly parallel (some oblique) to the mid vein. The hairs on the edges of the leaf are similar but are antrorse only and sometimes erect on the petiole. The hairs on the undersurface of the leaf are similar but mostly retrorse, with some antrorse hairs near the apex. Each rosette has 3–16 prostrate to ascending, unbranched bracteate inflorescences that are up to 47 mm long. The cauline leaves are up to 8 per inflorescence and are similar to the rosette leaves but smaller and decrease in size and become sessile toward the tip. Each inflorescence has up to 6 flowers, each borne on a pedicel up to 3 mm long at fruiting, and the lowest 1–4 flowers with a bract. The calyx is 5–6 mm long at flowering and 5–8 mm long at fruiting, lobed about one-third its length, and densely covered in antrorse and retrorse hairs that are mostly flexuous, and appressed to patent. The corolla is white, up to 8 mm in diameter, with a cylindrical tube, petals that are broadly obovate or very broadly ovate, and small yellow scales alternating with the petals. The stamens are 5–7 mm long (measured from the base of the calyx to the anther tips). The anthers are partly exserted, with the tips only just surpassing the scales. The four smooth, shiny, medium to dark brown nutlets are 1.5–2.1 mm long by 0.9–1.3 mm wide and ovoid in shape.

The chromosome number of M. venticola is unknown.

The pollen of M. venticola is unknown.

It flowers in January and fruits from January–February.

== Distribution and habitat ==
Myosotis venticola is a forget-me-not endemic to specific high-elevation areas of Otago and southern Canterbury, South Island, New Zealand, from 1350–1675 m ASL. There are herbarium specimens of M. venticola from the Dunstan Mountains, Saint Marys Range (Awakino Ski Field) and Saint Bathans Range; photos of a plant on Mt Kyeburn originally identified as M. cheesemanii are also likely to be this species, but there are no herbarium specimens of this species from there. It is found on exposed rocky or gravelly ground in high-elevation sites with sparsely vegetated cushion herbfields, tussocks or fell field.

== Conservation status ==
Myosotis venticola was not listed in the most recent assessment (2017–2018) under the New Zealand Threatened Classification system for plants.

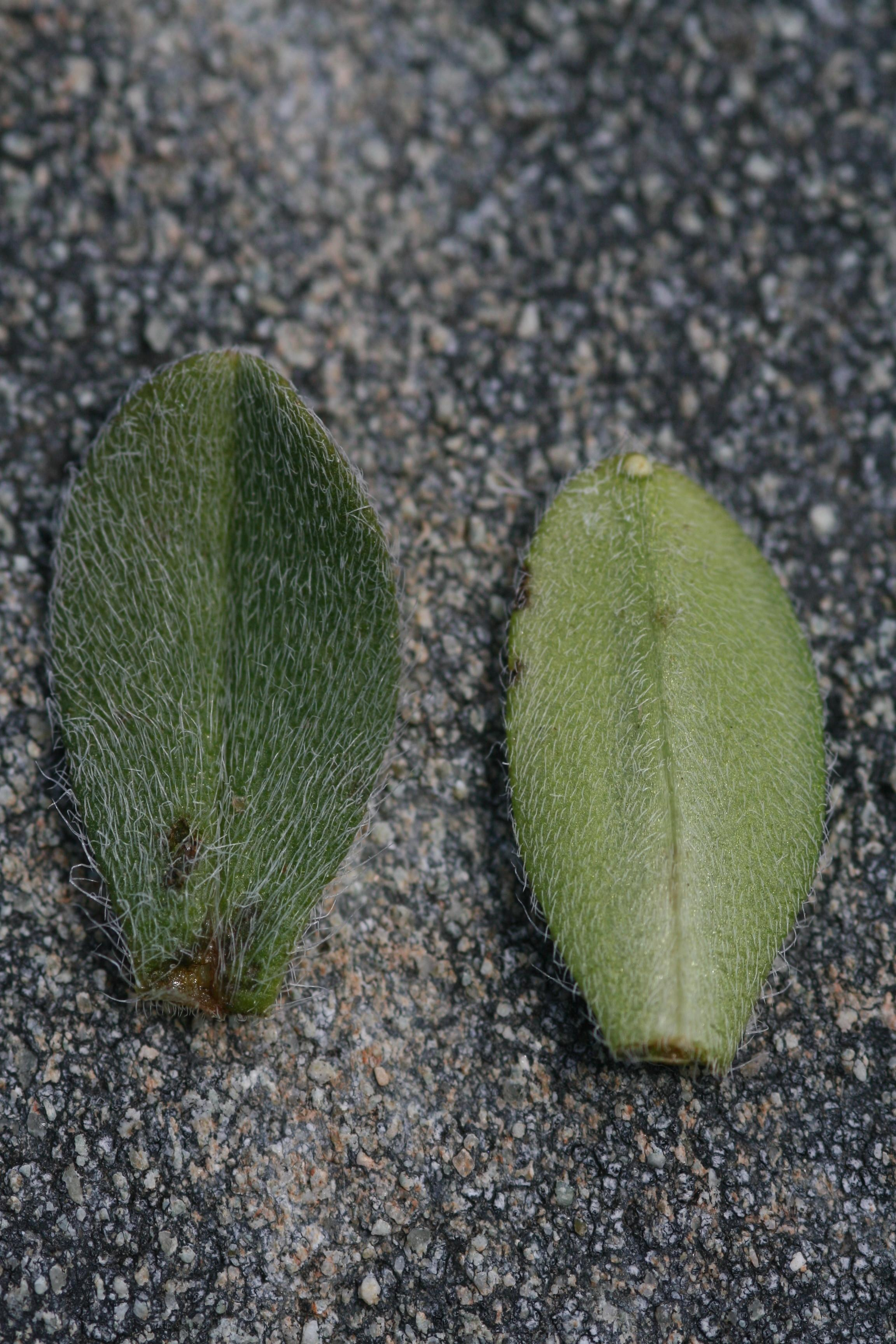
Upper surface and lower surface of rosette leaves showing hairs

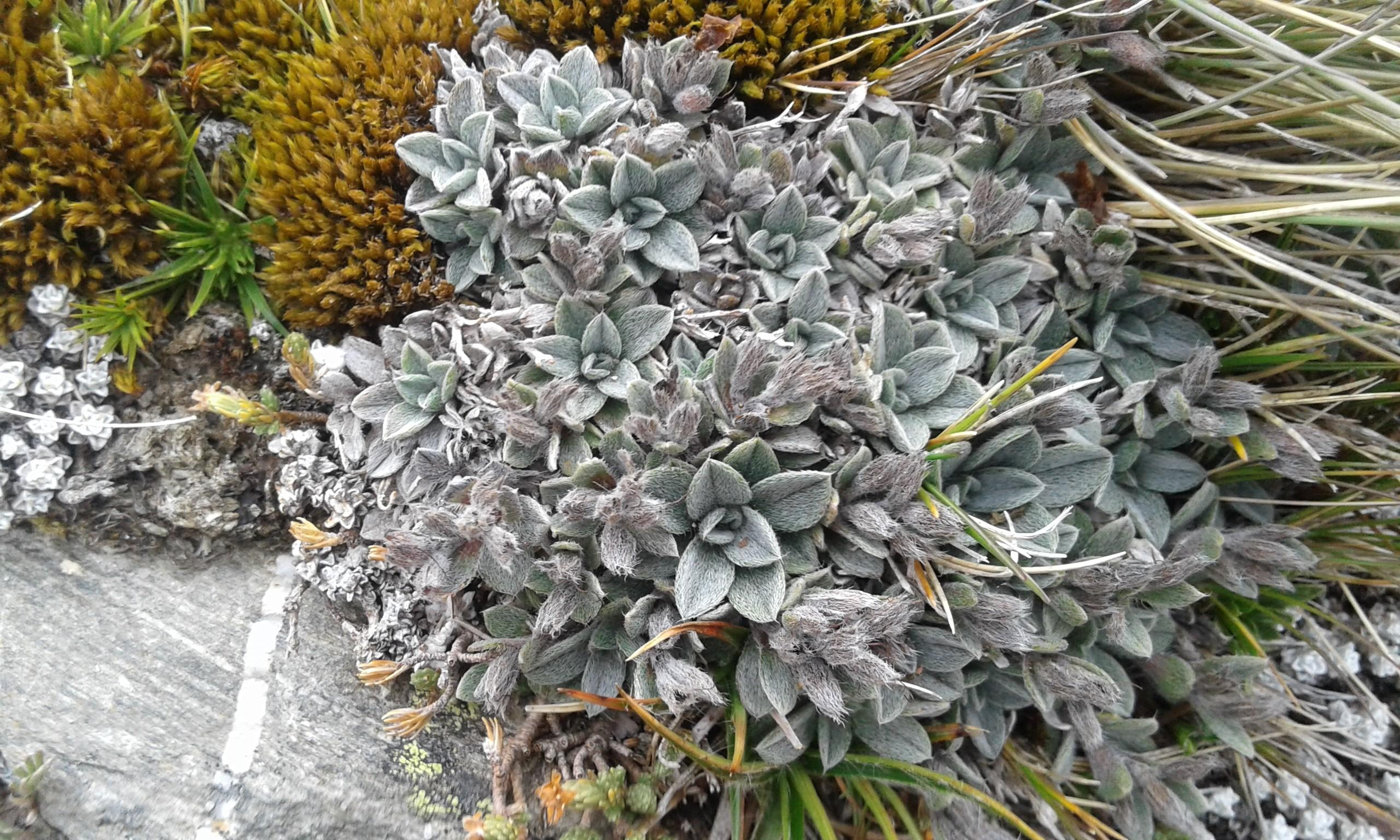
Habit

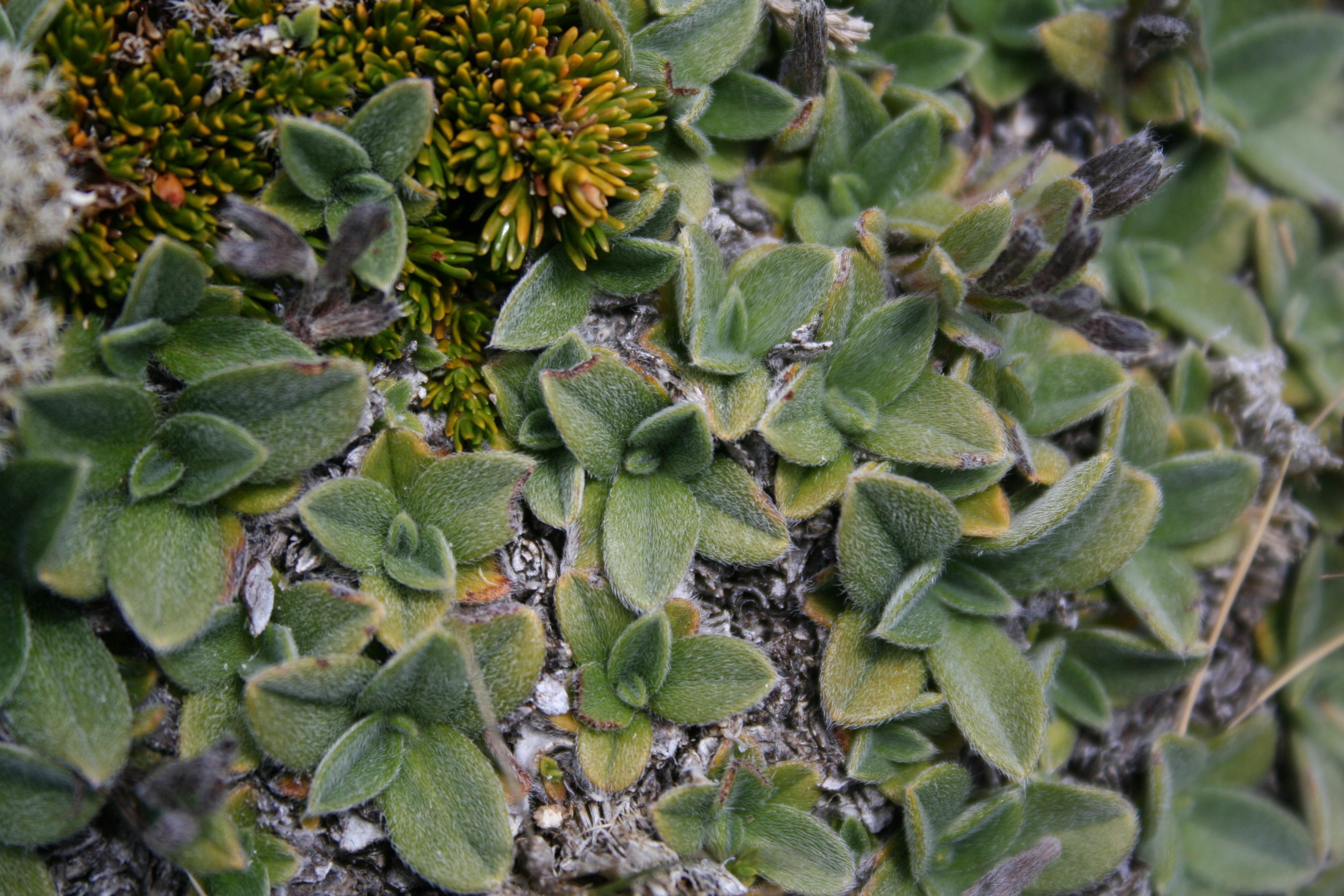
Leaf rosettes

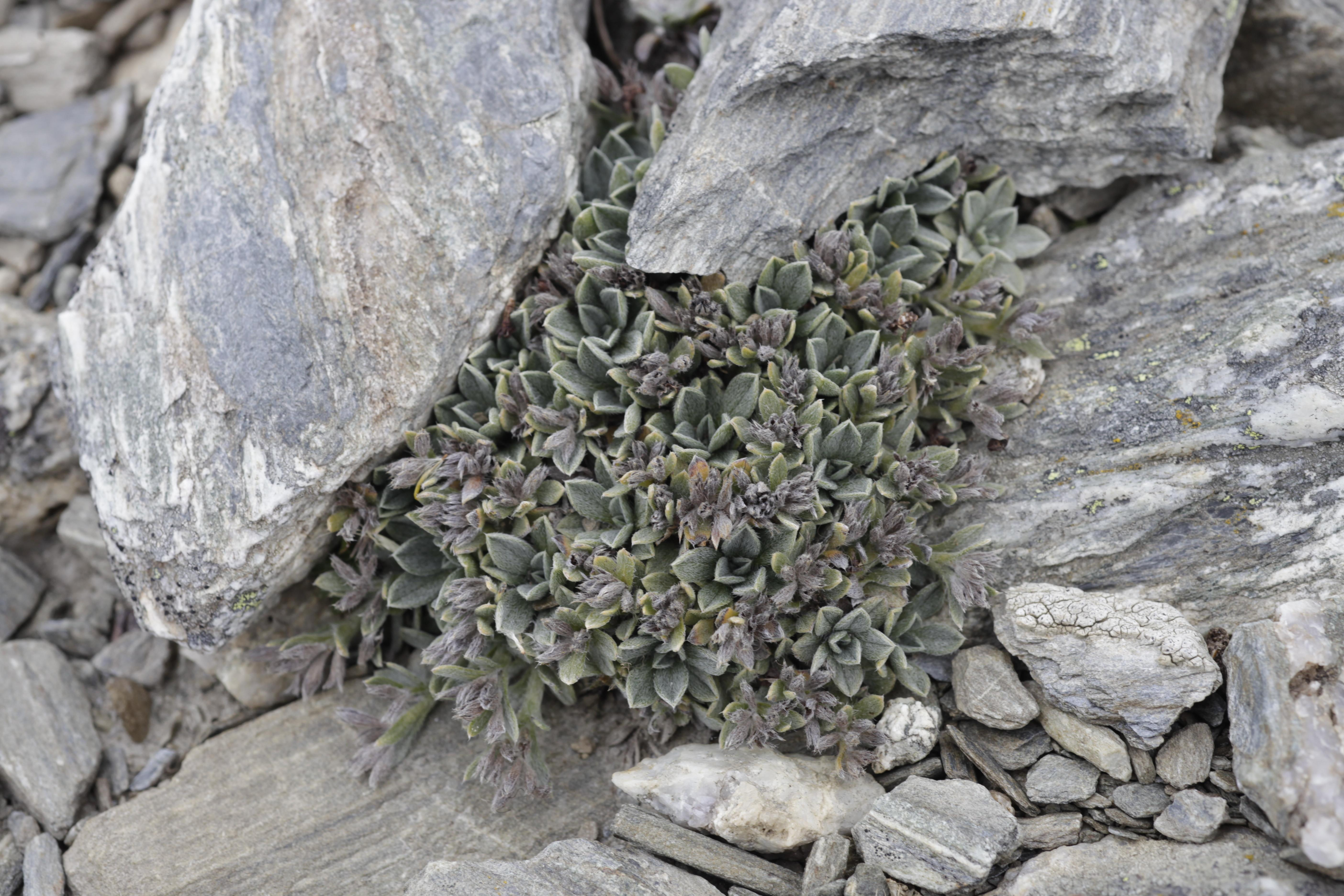
Plant growing in rocky substrate

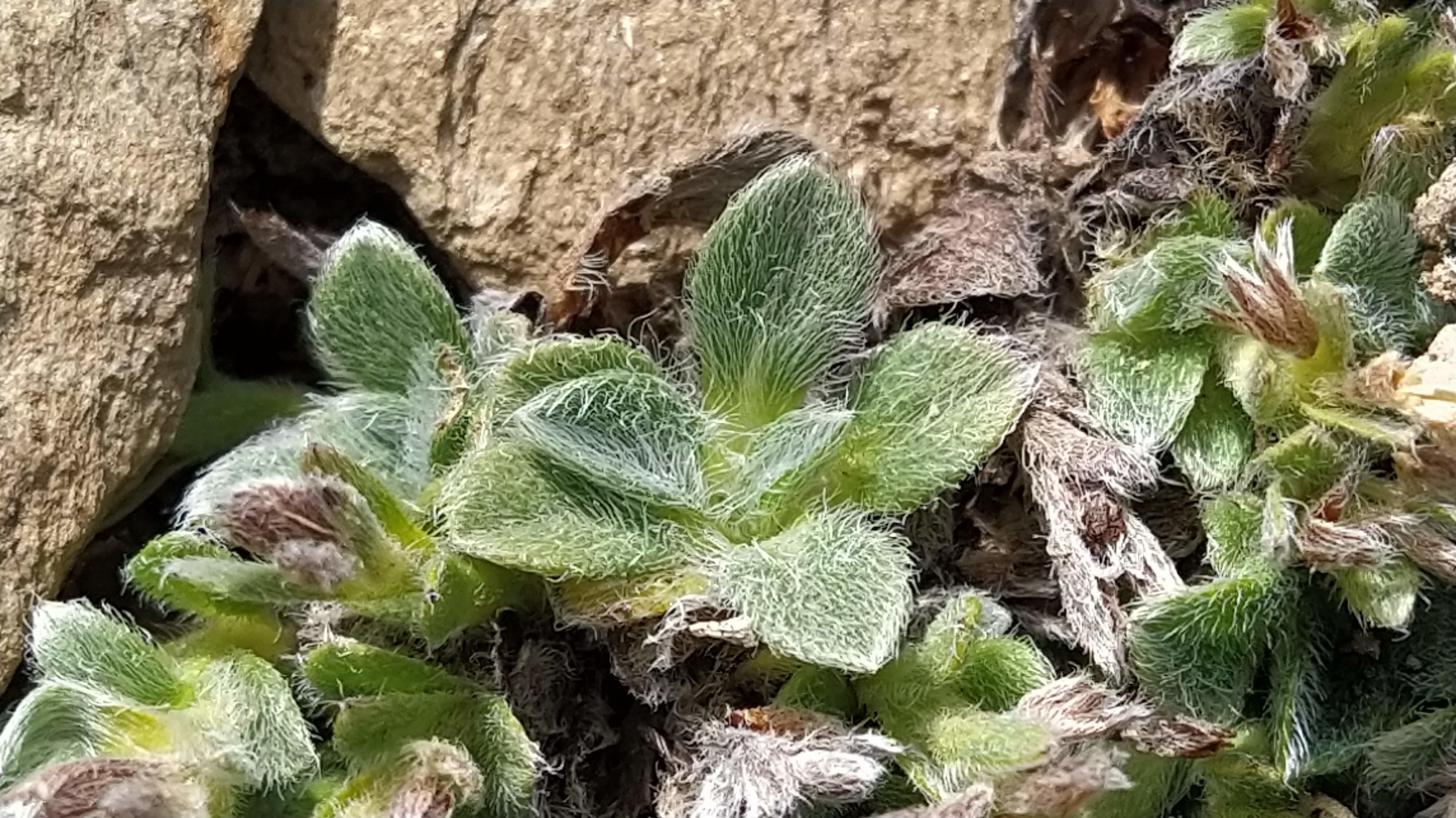
Close up of rosette leaves
