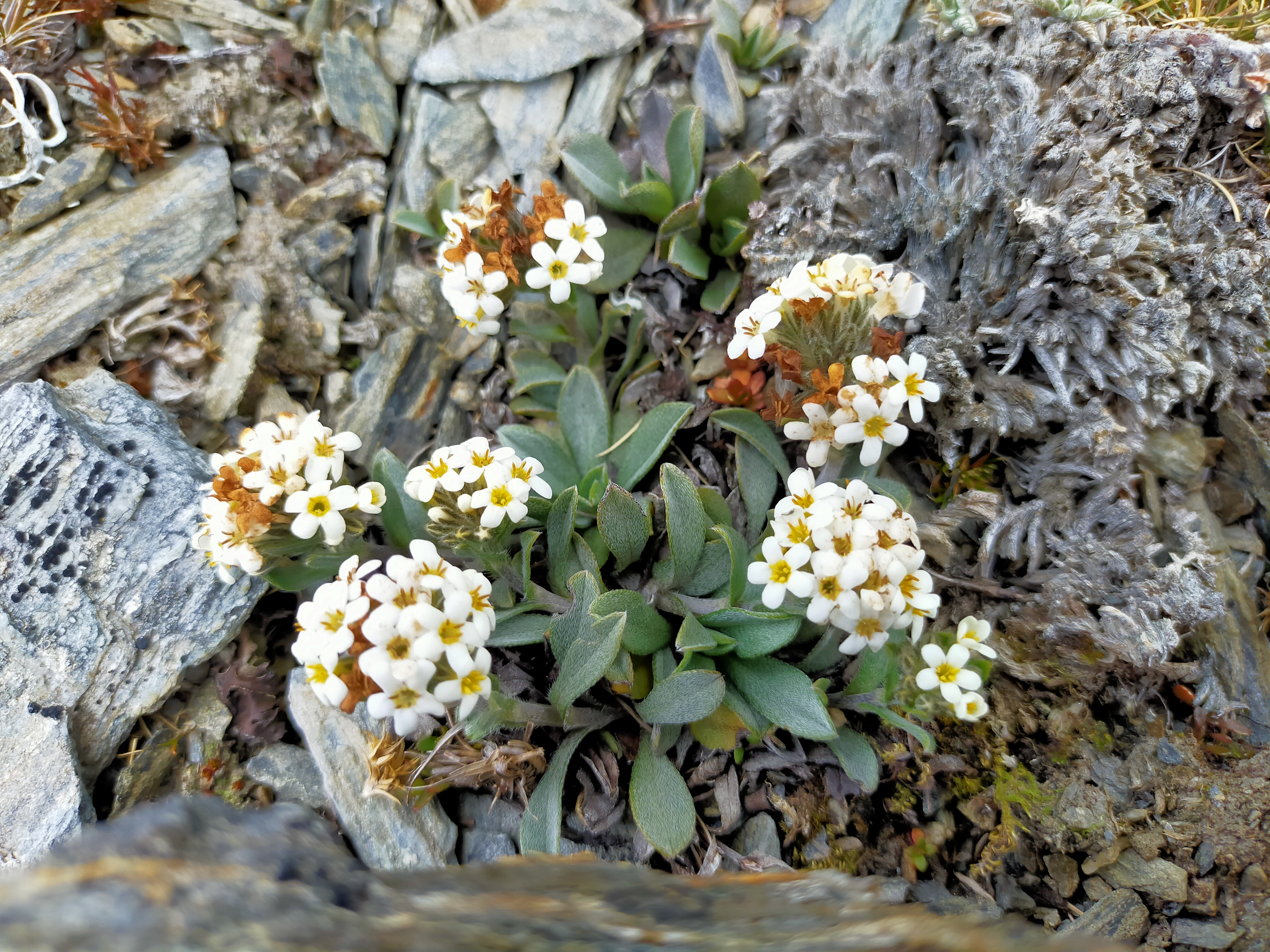
- flowering plant of Myosotis oreophila

Conservation status
- Nationally Critical (NZ TCS)

Scientific classification
- Kingdom: Plantae
- Clade: Tracheophytes
- Clade: Angiosperms
- Clade: Eudicots
- Clade: Asterids
- Order: Boraginales
- Family: Boraginaceae
- Genus: Myosotis
- Species: M. oreophila

Binomial name
- Myosotis oreophila Petrie

= Myosotis oreophila =

Species of flowering plant

Myosotis oreophila is a species of flowering plant in the family Boraginaceae, endemic to the South Island of New Zealand. Donald Petrie described the species in 1896. Plants of this species of forget-me-not are perennial rosettes with ebracteate inflorescences and white corollas with stamens that are partially exserted.

== Taxonomy and etymology ==
Myosotis orephila Petrie is in the plant family Boraginaceae. The species was originally described in 1896 by Donald Petrie. The most recent treatment of this species was done by Lucy B. Moore in the Flora of New Zealand.

The original specimens (type material) of Myosotis oreophila were collected by New Zealand Petrie from Mt Ida, Otago, New Zealand and are lodged at the herbarium WELT at the Museum of New Zealand Te Papa Tongarewa (e.g. WELT SP002393/A and SP002393/B).

Myosotis oreophila can be distinguished from almost all other species of southern hemisphere Myosotis by hairs mixed with antrorse (forward-facing) hairs on the upper side of the leaves. The only other species that has this trait is M. venticola.

== Phylogeny ==
The sole individual sampled of Myosotis oreophila was shown to be included in the southern hemisphere lineage of Myosotis in phylogenetic analyses of standard DNA sequencing markers (nuclear ribosomal DNA and chloroplast DNA regions) of New Zealand Myosotis. Within the southern hemisphere lineage, species relationships were not well resolved.

== Description ==
Myosotis oreophila plants are rosettes. The rosette leaves have long petioles that are about as long the leaf blades and difficult to distinguish from them. The rosette leaves are up to 40 mm long by 10 mm wide, linear-spathulate, widest at or above the middle, with an obtuse, apiculate apex. The upper surface of the leaf is uniformly and densely covered in appressed antrorse (forward-facing) hairs mixed with retrorse (backward-facing) hairs, whereas the lower surface is uniformly and sparsely covered in appressed and mostly retrorse hairs. Each rosette has few ascending to erect, ebracteate inflorescences that are up to 70 mm long. The cauline leaves are similar to the rosette leaves, but are smaller, become smaller toward the top of the inflorescence, linear-oblong, and subacute. The flowers are several per inflorescence, and each is borne on a short pedicel, without a bract. The calyx is 6–9 mm long at flowering and fruiting, lobed to less than one-half of its length, and with many hairs, some of which are retrorse near the base and others hooked. The corolla is white, with a cylindrical tube, and small scales alternating with the petals. The anthers are partially exserted. The nutlets are 1.8–2.4 × 1.0–1.2 mm.

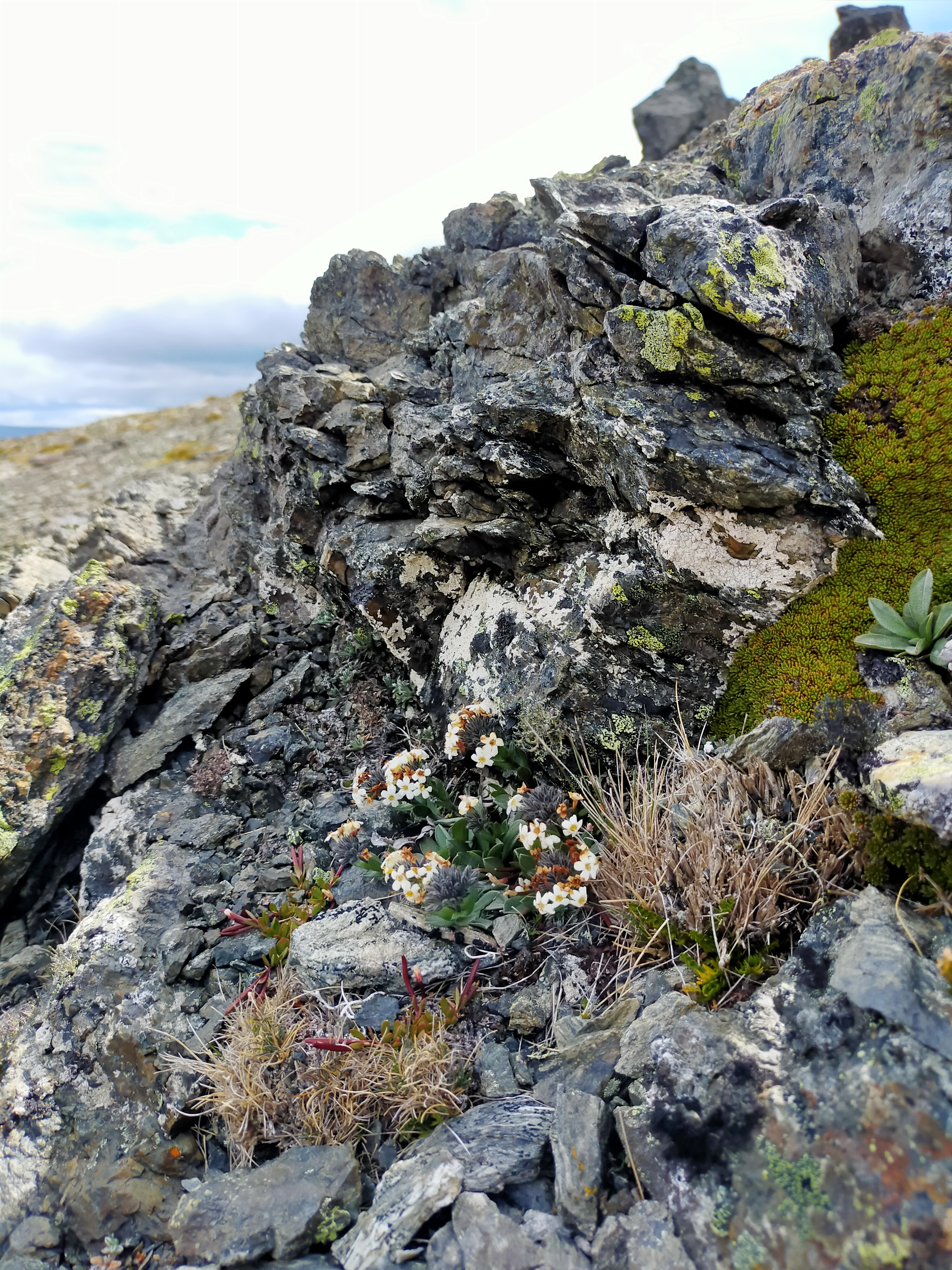
Rocky habitat with flowering individuals

The pollen of Myosotis oreophila is unknown.

The chromosome number of M. oreophila is unknown.

Flowering December–January; fruiting January–April.

== Distribution and habitat ==
Myosotis oreophila is a forget-me-not that is found in rocky, high-elevation fellfield habitats in Central Otago in the South Island of New Zealand. It is rare and localised to one or few known populations.

== Conservation status ==
Myosotis oreophila is listed as Threatened - Nationally Critical with the qualifiers "EF" (Extreme Fluctuations), "St" (Stable), and "Sp" (Sparse) on the most recent assessment (2017–2018) under the New Zealand Threatened Classification system for plants.

== Gallery ==
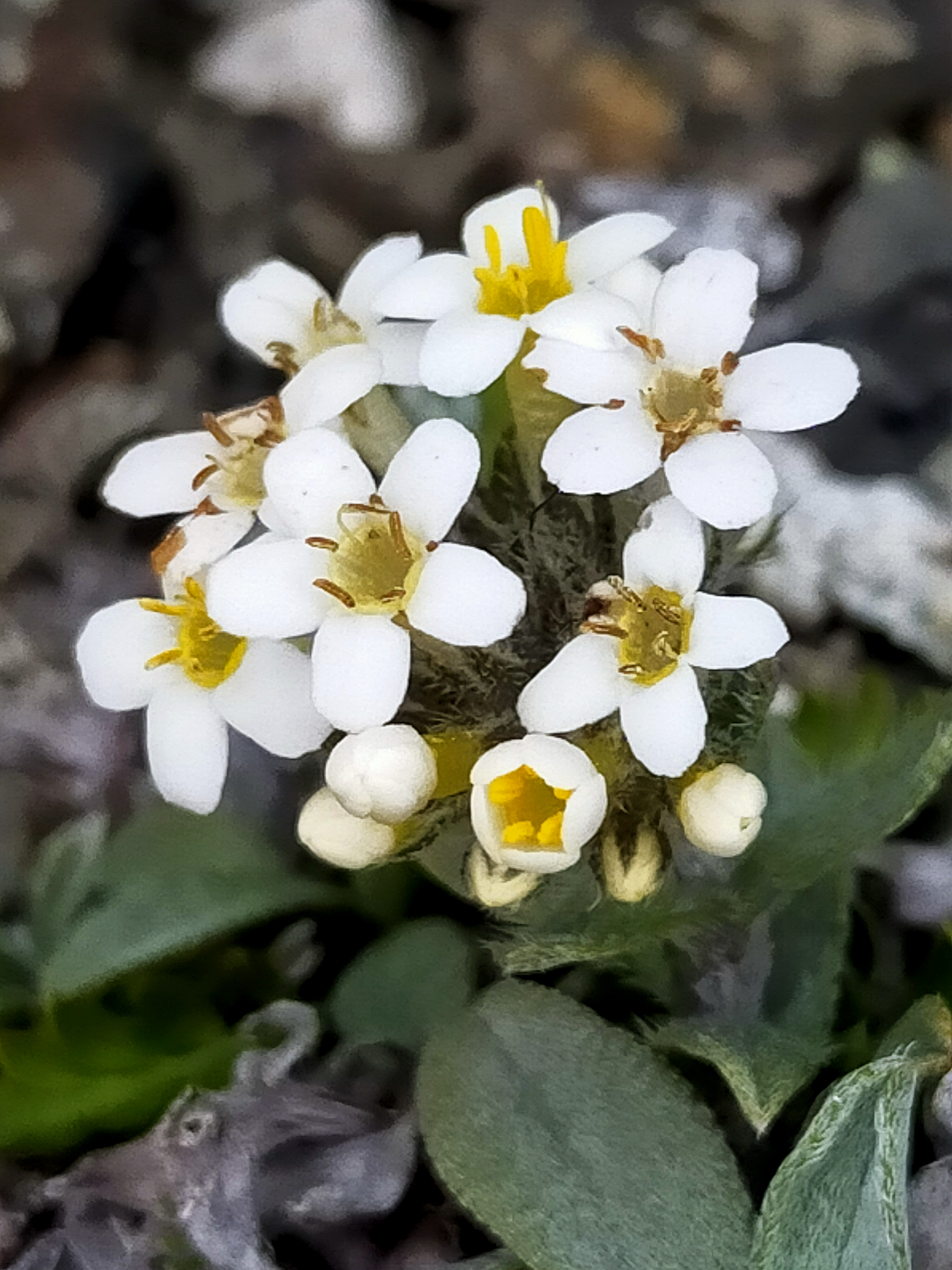
Flowers

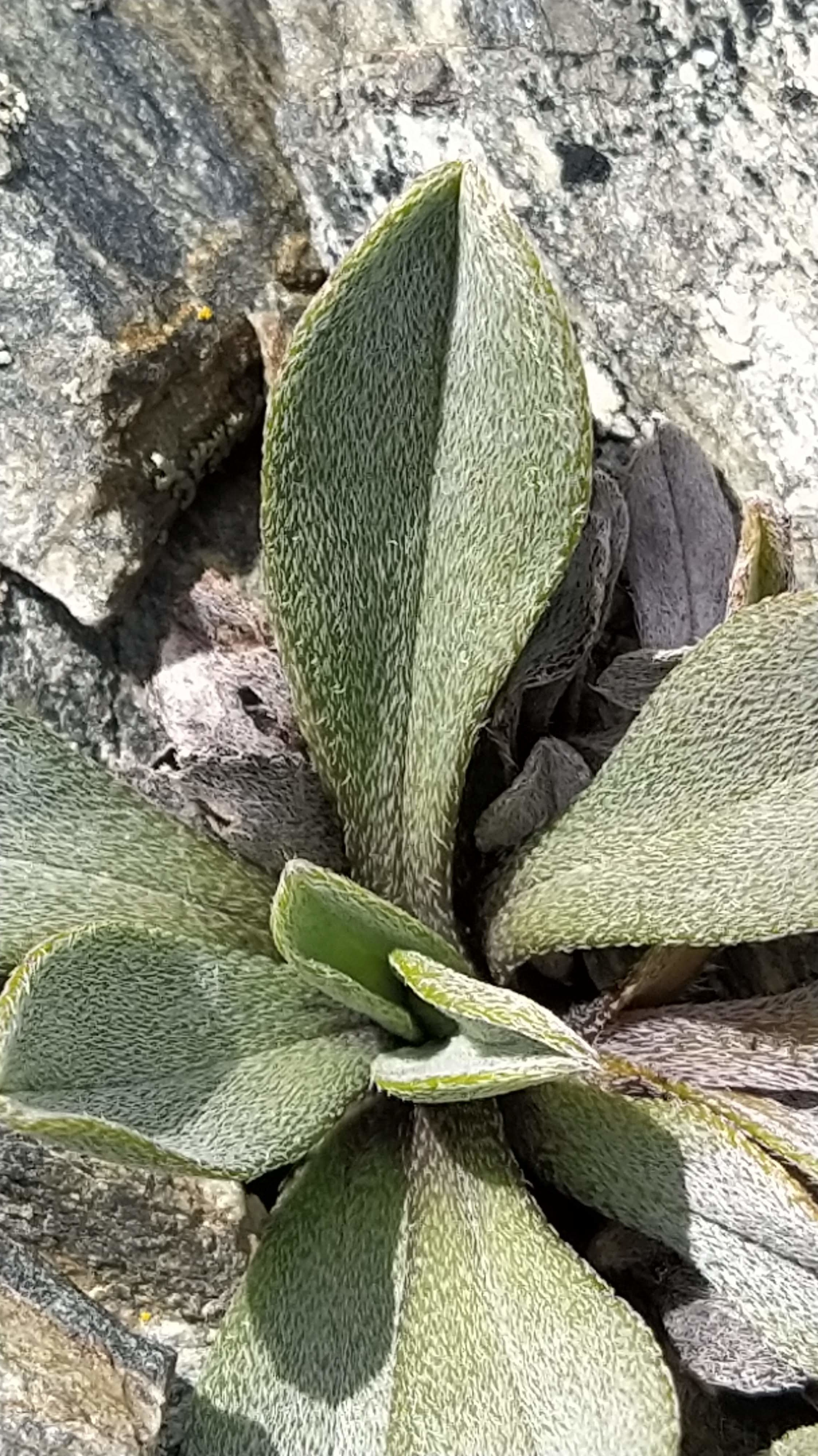
Close up of rosette leaves

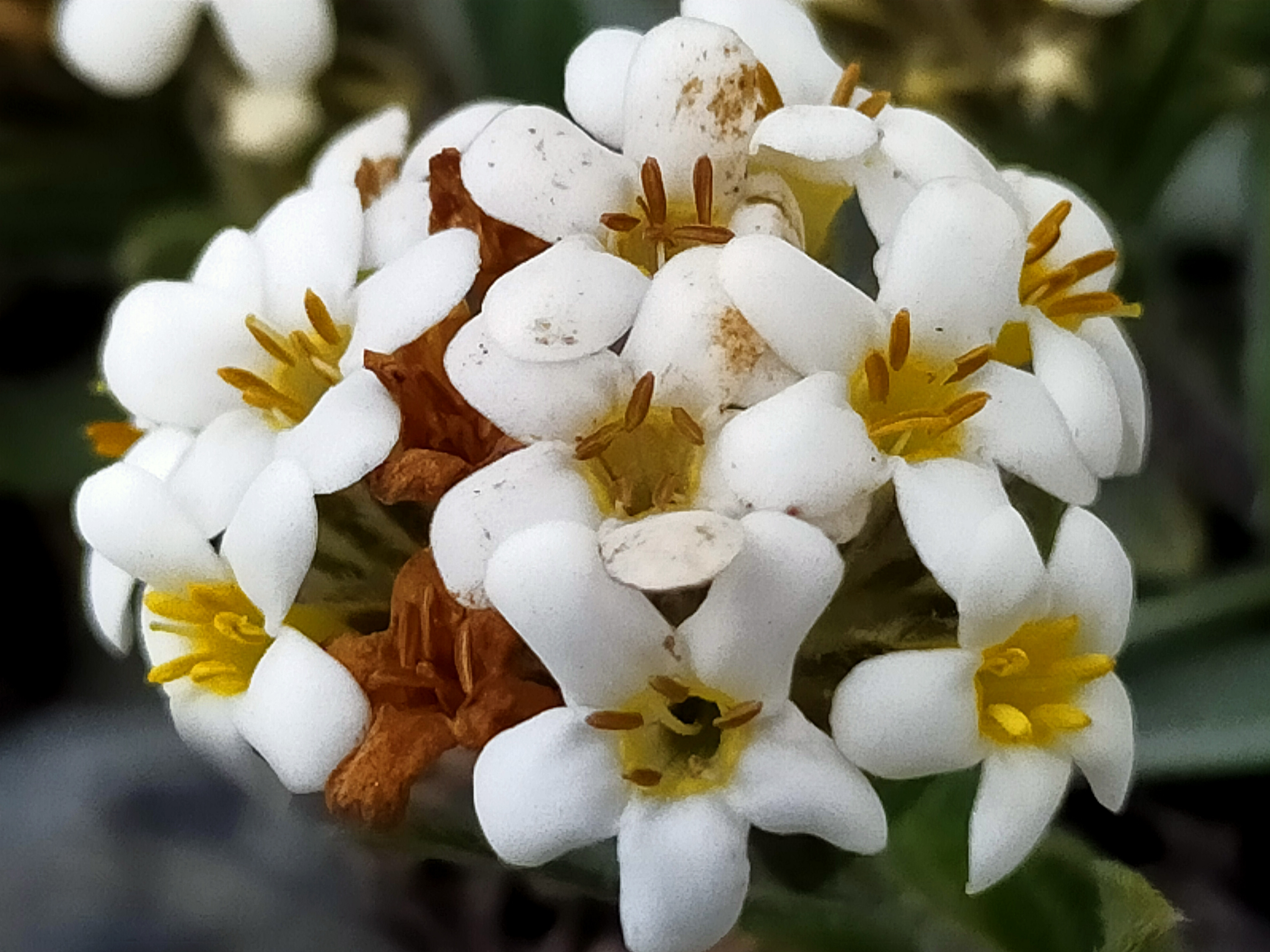
Close up of flowers with exserted anthers

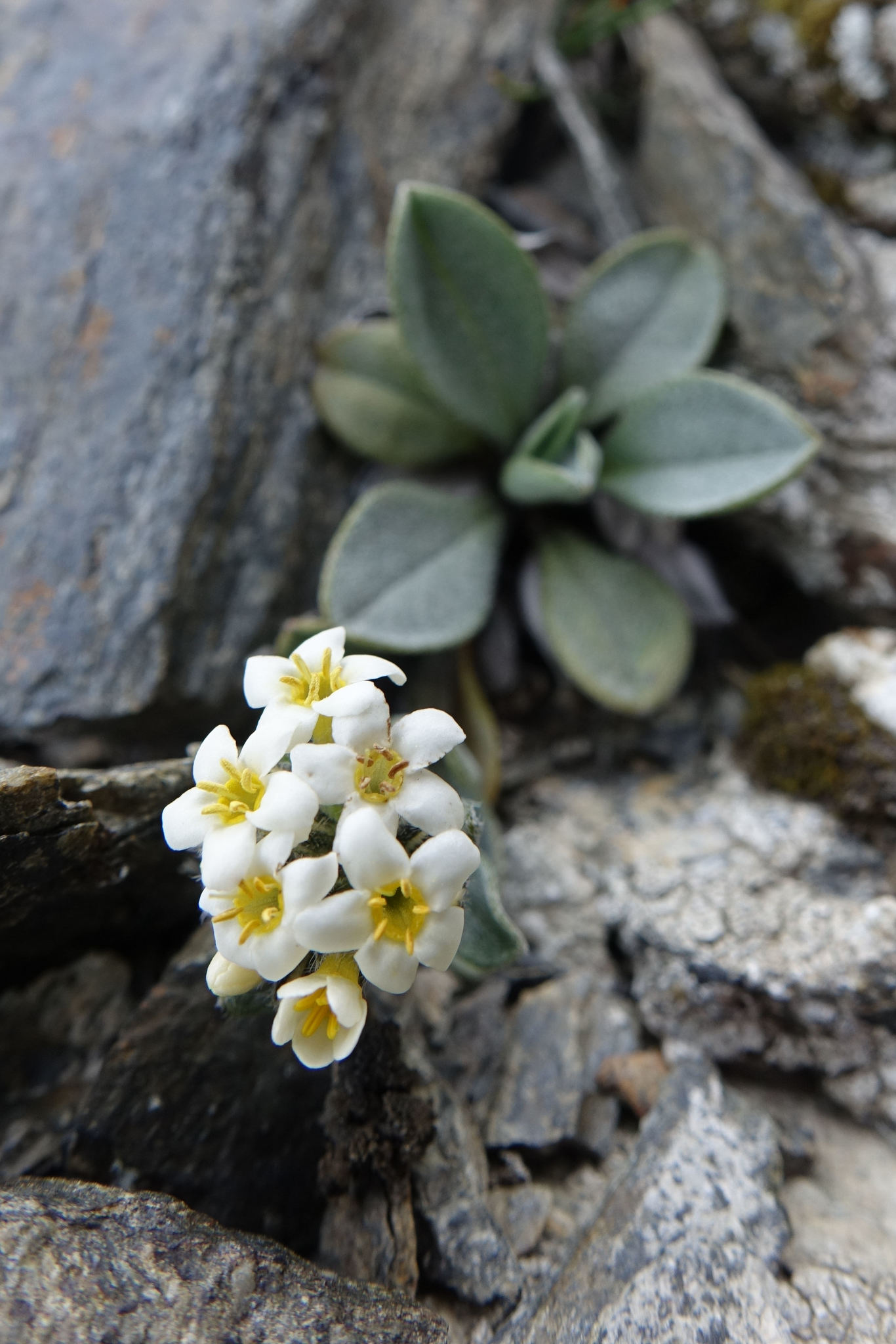
Flowering plant
