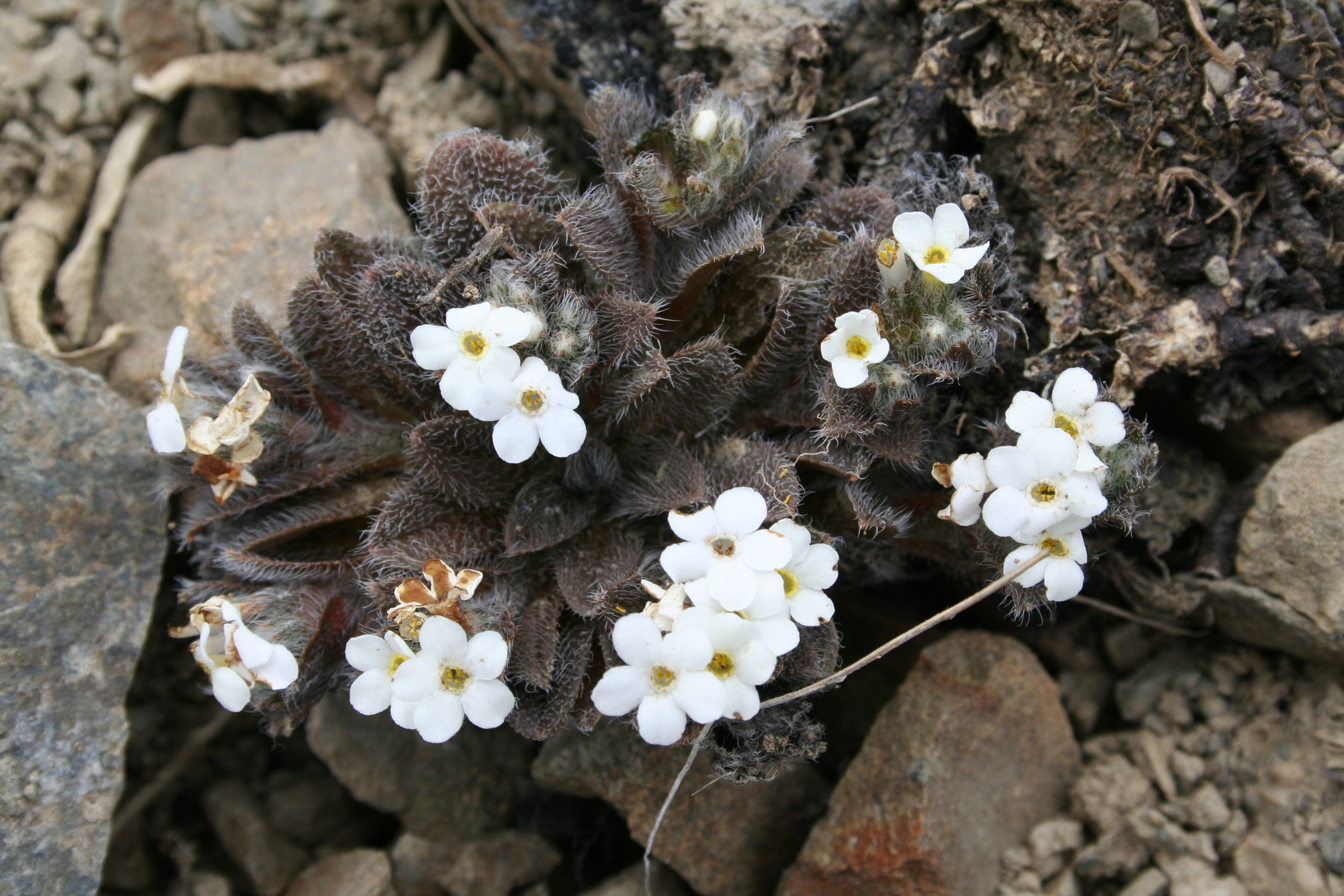
- Flowering plant of Myosotis lyallii subsp. elderi

Conservation status
- Nationally Vulnerable (NZ TCS)

Scientific classification
- Kingdom: Plantae
- Clade: Tracheophytes
- Clade: Angiosperms
- Clade: Eudicots
- Clade: Asterids
- Order: Boraginales
- Family: Boraginaceae
- Genus: Myosotis
- Species: M. lyallii
- Subspecies: M. l. subsp. elderi

Trinomial name
- Myosotis lyallii subsp. elderi (L.B.Moore) Meudt & Prebble

Synonyms
- Myosotis elderi L.B.Moore

= Myosotis lyallii subsp. elderi =

Subspecies of flowering plant endemic to New Zealand

Myosotis lyallii subsp. elderi is a subspecies of flowering plant in the family Boraginaceae, endemic to New Zealand. Lucy Moore described Myosotis elderi in 1961, and Heidi Meudt and Jessie Prebble treated it as a subspecies of M. lyallii in 2018. Plants of this subspecies of forget-me-not are perennial with a prostrate habit, bracteate inflorescences, and white corollas with partially exserted anthers.

== Taxonomy and etymology ==
Myosotis lyallii subsp. elderi (L.B.Moore) Meudt & Prebble is in the plant family Boraginaceae. The species Myosotis elderi was described in 1961 by Lucy Moore. In 2018, it was treated as a subspecies of M. lyallii.

The holotype specimen of Myosotis elderi is lodged at herbarium WELT at the Museum of New Zealand Te Papa Tongarewa (WELT SP002648).

The specific epithet, elderi, was chosen to honor Norman Elder (1896–1974), a New Zealand teacher, engineer and botanist.

This is one of two subspecies recognized in M. lyallii; the other is M. lyallii subsp. lyallii. The subspecies are largely allopatric, as M. lyallii subsp. elderi is generally found on the dry, eastern side of the main divide of the South Island, whereas M. lyallii subsp. lyallii is generally found in the wet, western side. In M. lyallii subsp. elderi, the anthers are at least partly below the faucal scales (partially exserted), whereas in M. lyallii subsp. lyallii, they are usually wholly above the faucal scales (fully exserted). Furthermore, M. lyallii subsp. elderi has shorter filaments (< 0.6 mm) and wholly bracteate inflorescences, whereas M. lyallii subsp. lyallii has longer filaments > 0.6 mm long and at least some inflorescences that are partially bracteate.

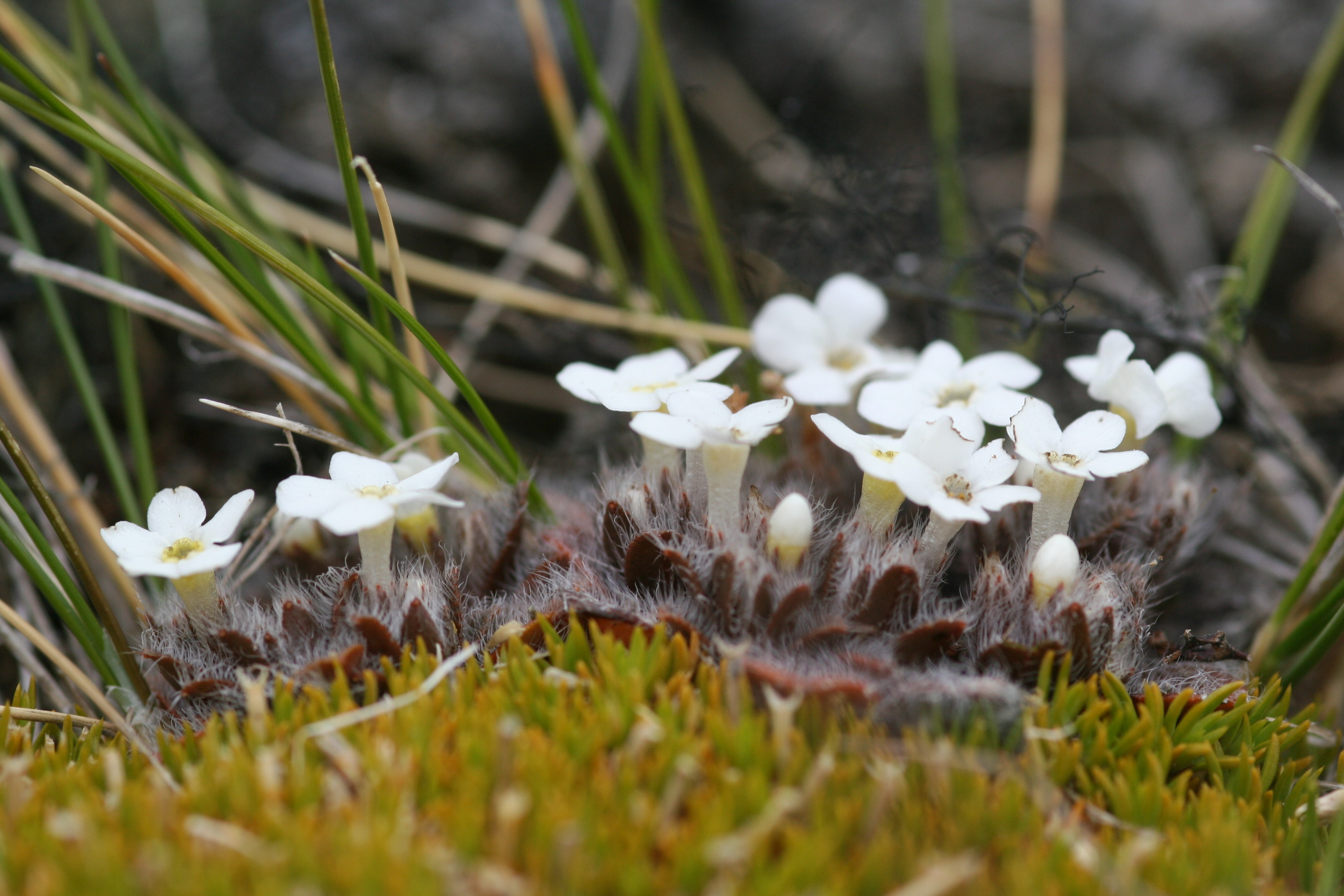
Flowering plant, side on

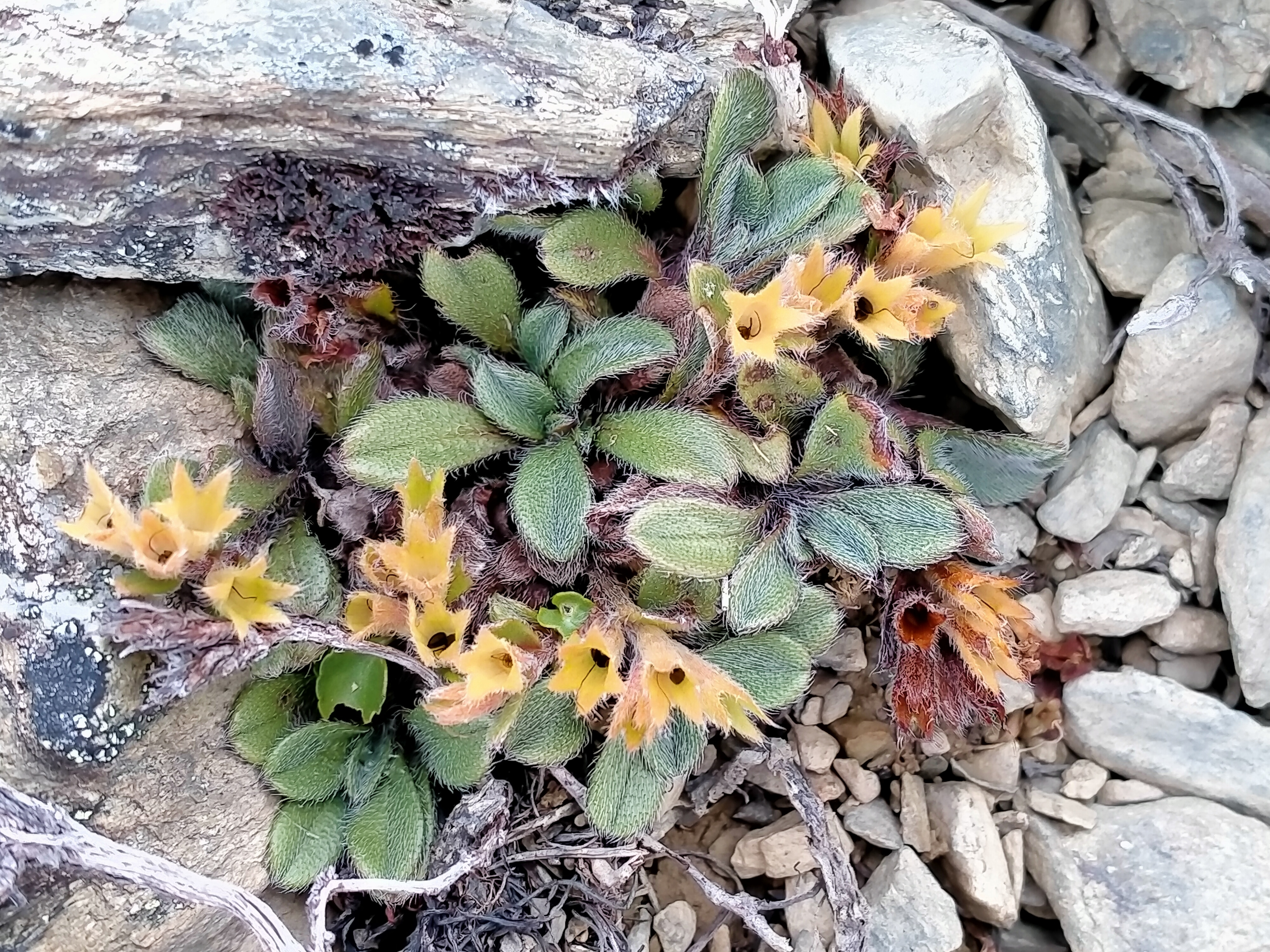
Fruiting plant

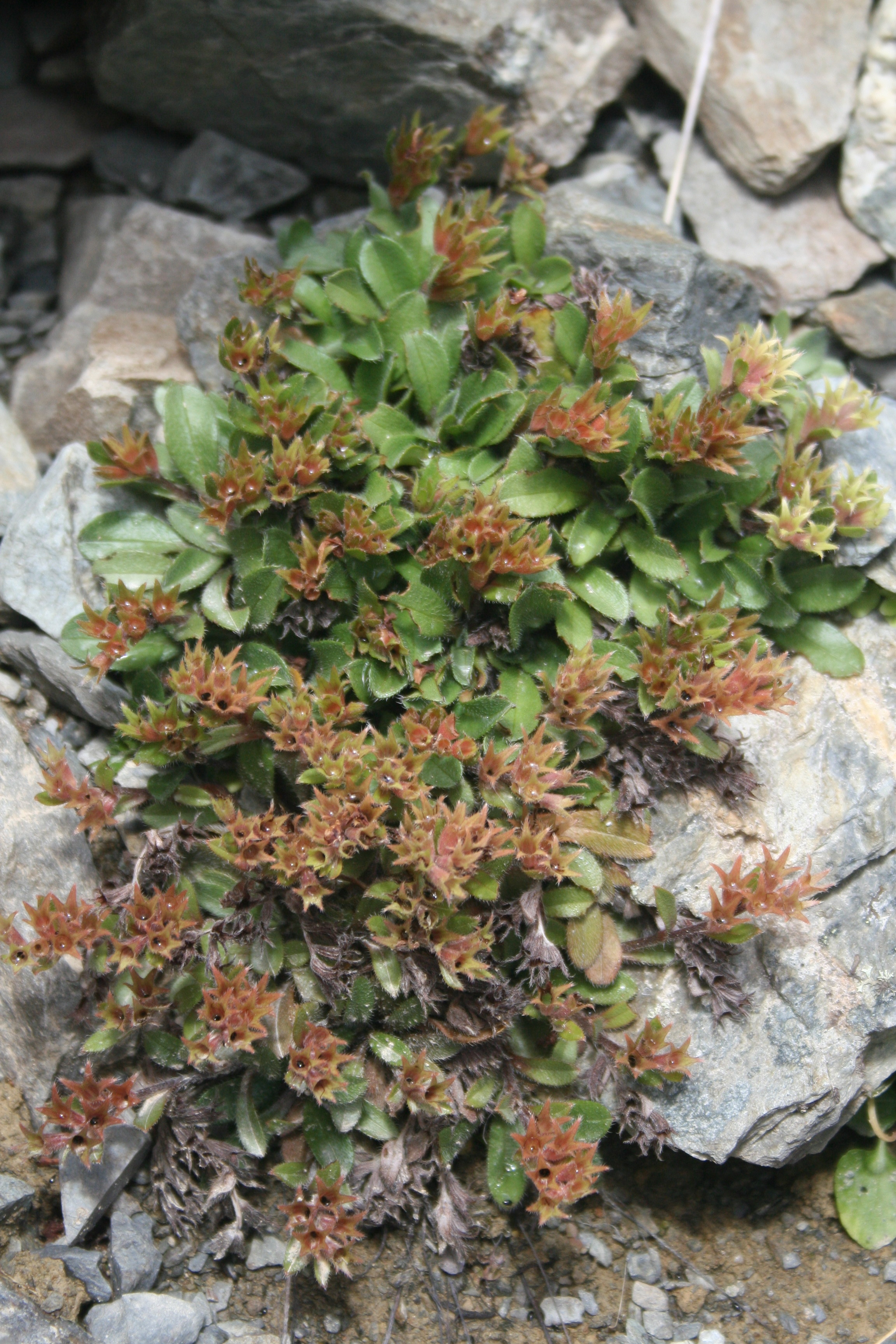
Large fruiting plant

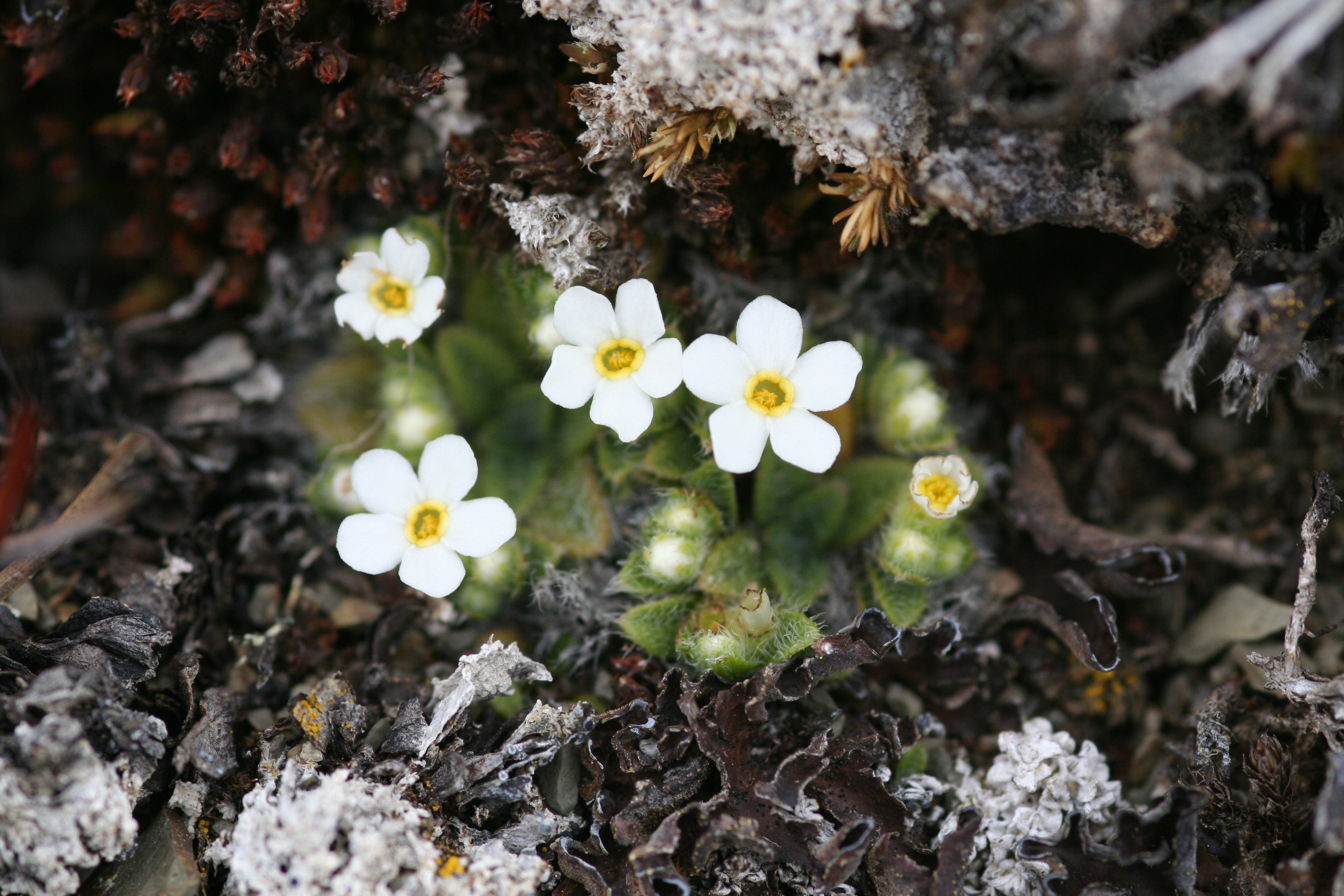
Small flowering plant

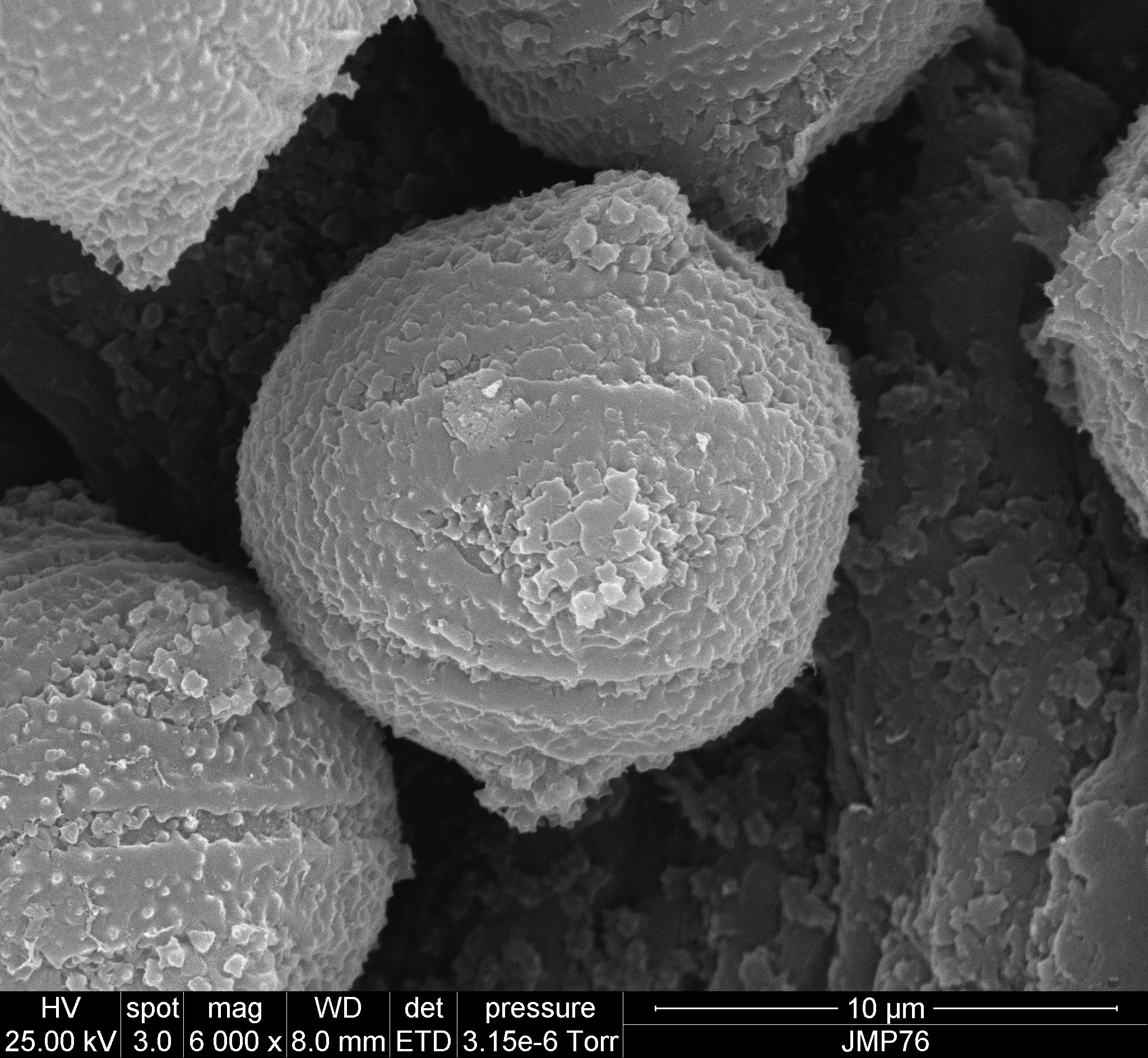
Pollen grain

== Phylogeny ==
To date, Myosotis lyallii subsp. elderi has not been included in any published phylogenetic analyses using standard DNA sequencing markers (nuclear ribosomal DNA and chloroplast DNA regions).

== Description ==
Myosotis lyallii subsp. elderi plants are rosettes that grow together forming loose clumps. The rosette leaves have petioles usually 1–6 mm long (rarely up to 13 mm long). The rosette leaf blades are 3–21 mm long by 2–13 mm wide (length: width ratio 1.1–3.6: 1), usually narrowly obovate to broadly obovate, usually widest at or above the middle, and usually with an obtuse apex. The upper surface of the leaf are densely covered in long, flexuous (sometimes curved), usually patent, antrorse (forward-facing) hairs that are oriented parallel to the mid vein; the leaf margin and petiole margin have patent to erect hairs. The lower surface of the leaf is similar except it can be glabrous or with isolated hairs on the midrib only. Each rosette has 1–19 prostrate or ascending, unbranched or once-branched, wholly bracteate inflorescences that are up to 105 mm long (rarely up to 230 mm long). The cauline leaves (sometimes called bracts) are similar to the rosette leaves but smaller, and decrease in size and become sessile toward the tip. Each inflorescence has 2–15 flowers, each borne on a short pedicel, and each usually with a bract. The calyx is 3–7 mm long at flowering and 4–8 mm long at fruiting, lobed to one-third to two-thirds its length, and densely covered in long, antrorse, mostly flexuous, appressed to patent hairs (sometimes mixed with retrorse or backward-facing hairs, or curved or rarely hooked hairs, on the calyx base). The corolla is white, up to 11 mm in diameter, with a cylindrical tube, petals that are broadly to very broadly ovate or obovate to very broadly obovate, and flat, and small yellow scales alternating with the petals. The anthers are 2–9 mm long and partially exserted, with the tips or upper third only surpassing the scales. The filaments are 0–0.5 mm long. The four smooth, shiny, light, medium or dark brown nutlets are 1.1–2.4 mm long by 0.6–1.5 mm wide and narrowly ovoid to ovoid in shape.

The chromosome number of M. lyallii subsp. elderi is unknown.

M. lyallii subsp. elderi has M. australis type pollen.

It flowers and fruits from November–April, with the main flowering period December–February and the main fruiting period January–March.

== Distribution and habitat ==
Myosotis lyallii subsp. elderi is a forget-me-not endemic to the mountains of eastern areas of the South Island New Zealand from 1100–2200 m ASL in the following ecological districts: Marlborough, Westland, Canterbury, Otago, Southland and Fiordland. It is also found on the North Island in the Southern North Island ecological district. M. lyallii subsp. elderi is an occasional plant in rocky, exposed, are rather bare high-elevation sites such as saddles, ridges and moraines, in sparsely vegetated fellfields and tussock-grasslands, herbfields and cushion turf.

== Conservation status ==
Myosotis lyallii subsp. elderi is listed (as M. elderi) as "Threatened - Nationally Vulnerable", with the qualifiers "DP" (Data Poor) and "Sp" (Sparse) in the most recent assessment (2017-2018) under the New Zealand Threatened Classification system for plants.
