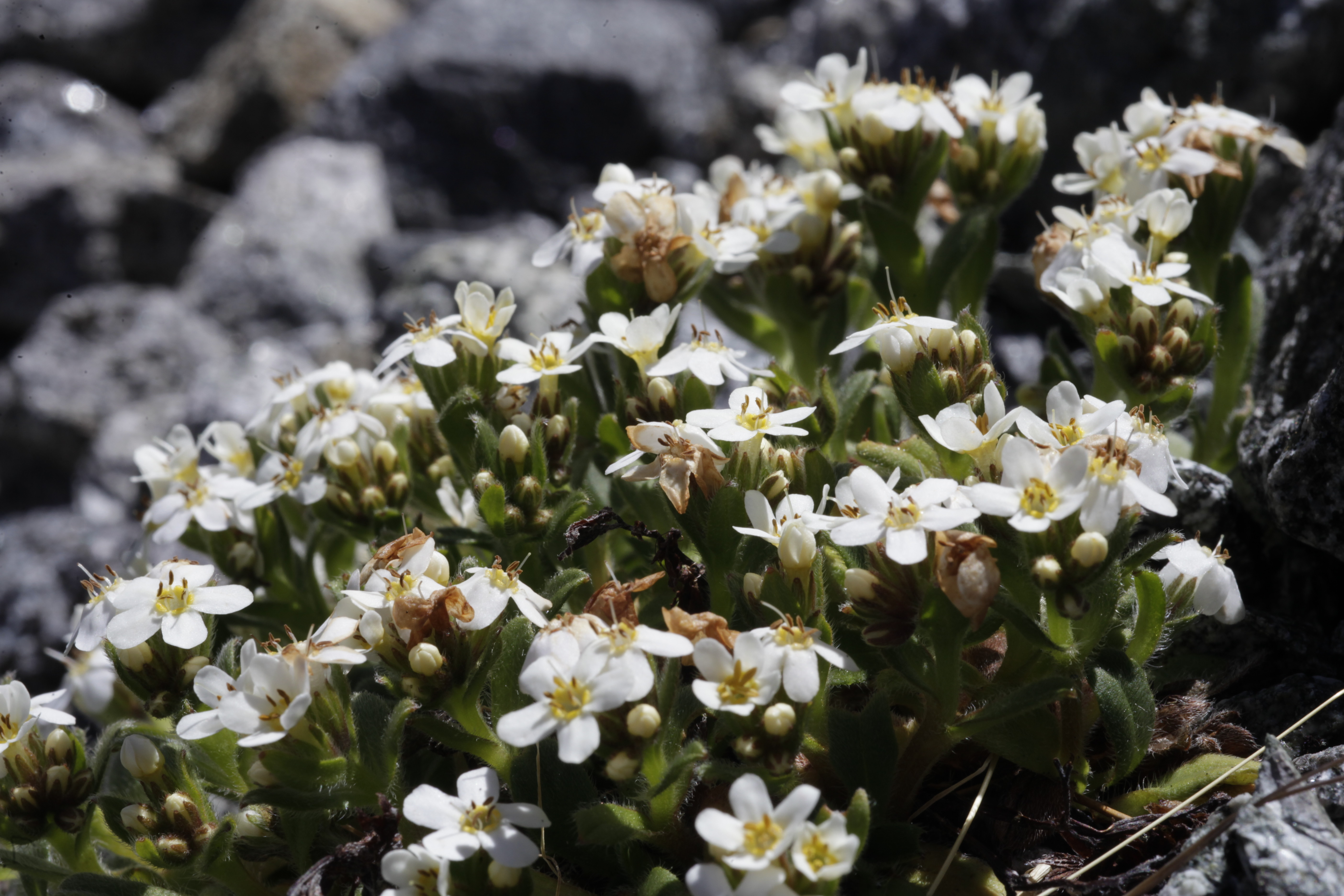

Conservation status
- Naturally Uncommon (NZ TCS)

Scientific classification
- Kingdom: Plantae
- Clade: Tracheophytes
- Clade: Angiosperms
- Clade: Eudicots
- Clade: Asterids
- Order: Boraginales
- Family: Boraginaceae
- Genus: Myosotis
- Species: M. lyallii

Binomial name
- Myosotis lyallii Hook.f.

= Myosotis lyallii =

Species of flowering plant

Myosotis lyallii is a species of flowering plant in the family Boraginaceae, endemic to New Zealand. Joseph Dalton Hooker described the species in 1853. Plants of this species of forget-me-not are perennial with a prostrate habit, bracteate or partially-bracteate inflorescences, and white corollas.

== Taxonomy and etymology ==
Myosotis lyallii Hook.f. is in the plant family Boraginaceae and was described in 1853 by Joseph Dalton Hooker in Flora Novae-Zelandiae. It is morphologically most similar to two other bracteate-prostrate species of Myosotis endemic to the South Island, M. retrorsa and M. pulvinaris. M. lyallii differs from M. pulvinaris in its habit, which is multiple rosettes forming loose clumps, rather than the compact cushion of M. pulvinaris, and has multiple flowers per inflorescence, usually 4–11 compared to the solitary flowers in M. pulvinaris. It differs from M. retrorsa in its lack of retrorse hairs on the calyx and on the underside of the rosette and cauline leaves, and its higher leaf lamina length : width ratio (usually > 1.3 : 1 vs < 1.3: 1).

The holotype specimen of Myosotis lyallii is lodged at Kew Herbarium (K000357221).

The specific epithet, lyallii, was chosen to honor David Lyall, who was Joseph Hooker's friend and fellow assistant surgeon on the Ross Expedition, and who collected the type specimen during that voyage.

Two subspecies are recognized: Myosotis lyallii subsp. lyallii, and M. lyallii subsp. elderi. The subspecies are largely allopatric, and can be distinguished from one another based on inflorescence characteristics, filament length and anther exsertion.

== Phylogeny ==
To date, Myosotis lyallii has not been included in any published phylogenetic analyses using standard DNA sequencing markers (nuclear ribosomal DNA and chloroplast DNA regions).

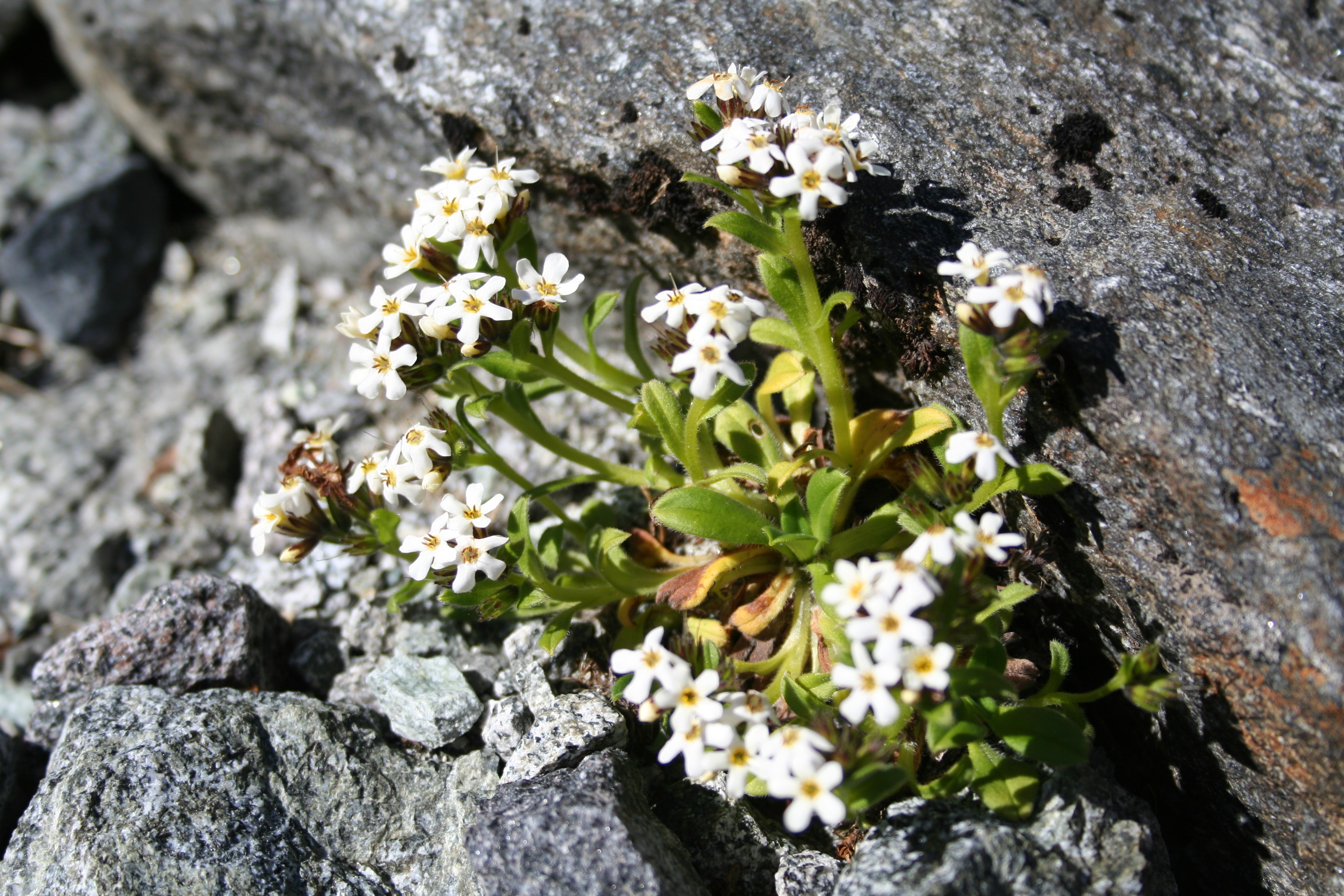
Flowering plant of subsp. lyallii

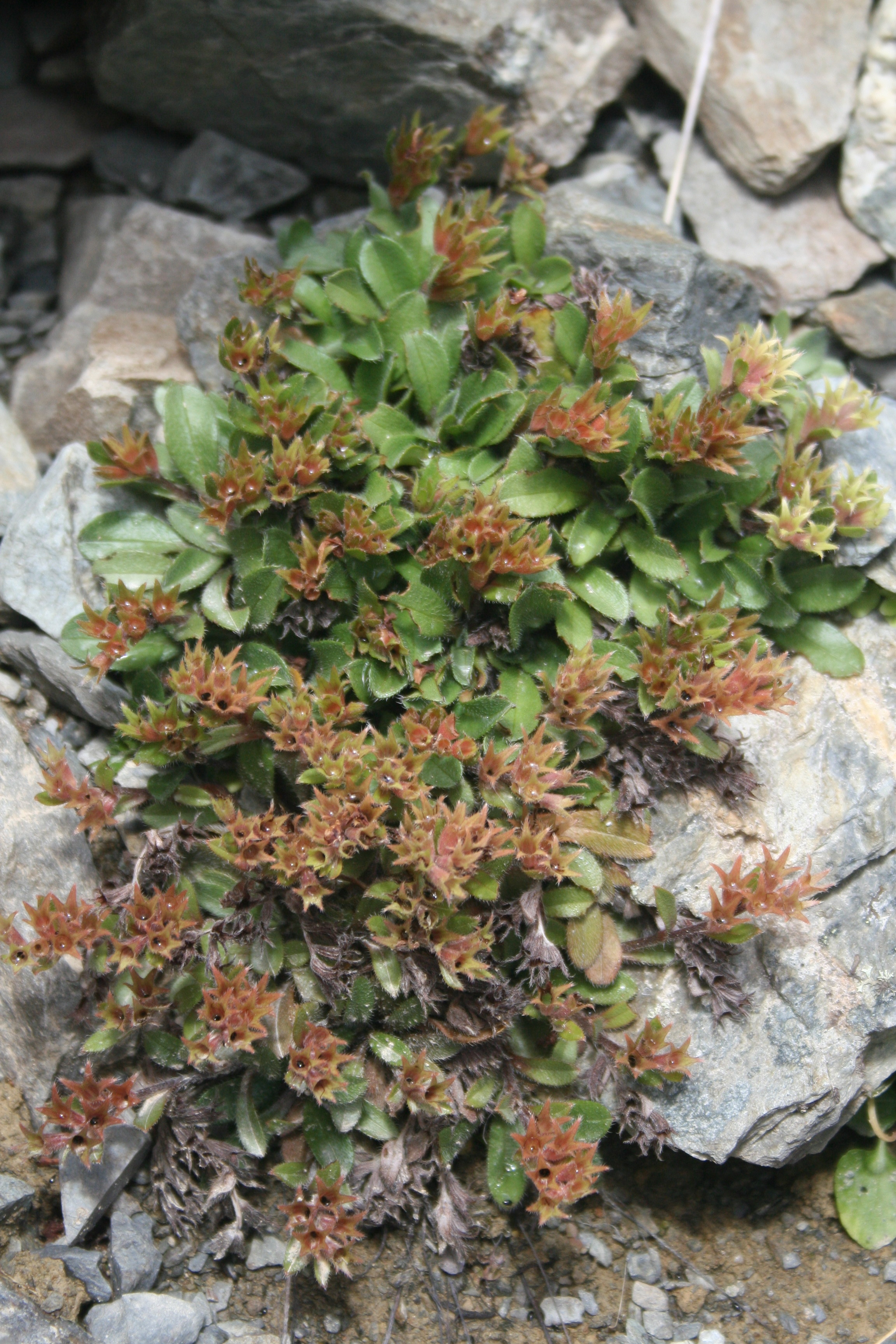
Fruiting plant of subsp. elderi

== Description ==
Myosotis lyallii plants are rosettes that grow together forming loose clumps. The rosette leaves have petioles usually 1–18 mm long (rarely up to 40 mm long). The rosette leaf blades are 3–27 mm long by 2–13 mm wide (length: width ratio 1.1–3.6: 1), usually narrowly obovate to broadly obovate, usually widest at or above the middle, and usually with an obtuse apex. The upper surface of the leaf are densely covered in long, flexuous (sometimes curved), usually patent, antrorse (forward-facing) hairs that are oriented parallel to the mid vein; the leaf margin and petiole margin have patent to erect hairs. The lower surface of the leaf is similar except it can be glabrous or with isolated hairs on the midrib only. Each rosette has 1–19 prostrate or ascending, unbranched or once-branched, bracteate or partially-bracteate inflorescences that are up to 105 mm long (rarely up to 230 mm long). The cauline leaves (sometimes called bracts) are similar to the rosette leaves but smaller, and decrease in size and become sessile toward the tip. Each inflorescence has 2–15 flowers, each borne on a short pedicel, and each usually with a bract. The calyx is 3–7 mm long at flowering and 4–8 mm long at fruiting, lobed to one-third to two-thirds its length, and densely covered in long, antrorse, mostly flexuous, appressed to patent hairs (sometimes mixed with retrorse or backward-facing hairs, or curved or rarely hooked hairs, on the calyx base). The corolla is white, up to 11 mm in diameter, with a cylindrical tube, petals that are broadly to very broadly ovate or obovate to very broadly obovate, and flat, and small yellow scales alternating with the petals. The anthers are fully exserted or partially exserted, with the tips or upper third only surpassing the scales. The four smooth, shiny, light, medium or dark brown nutlets are 1.1–2.4 mm long by 0.6–1.5 mm wide and narrowly ovoid to ovoid in shape.

The chromosome number of M. lyallii is unknown.

M. lyallii has M. australis type pollen.

It flowers and fruits from November–April.

== Distribution and habitat ==
Myosotis lyallii is a forget-me-not endemic to the mountains of the New Zealand from 900–2200 m ASL. It is found throughout the South Island, including the following ecological districts: Western Nelson, Marlborough, Westland, Canterbury, Otago, Southland and Fiordland. There are also records from the North Island (Southern North Island ecological province). M. lyallii is found in subalpine to alpine habitats including grasslands, fellfields and herbfields.

== Conservation status ==
The two subspecies of M. lyallii have different conservation status listings in the most recent assessment (2017-2018) under the New Zealand Threatened Classification system for plants. Myosotis lyallii subsp. lyallii is listed as "At Risk - Naturally Uncommon", with the qualifiers "DP" (Data Poor) and "Sp" (Sparse), whereas M. lyallii subsp. elderi is listed (as Myosotis elderi) as "Threatened - Nationally Vulnerable", also with the qualifiers "DP" (Data Poor) and "Sp" (Sparse).
