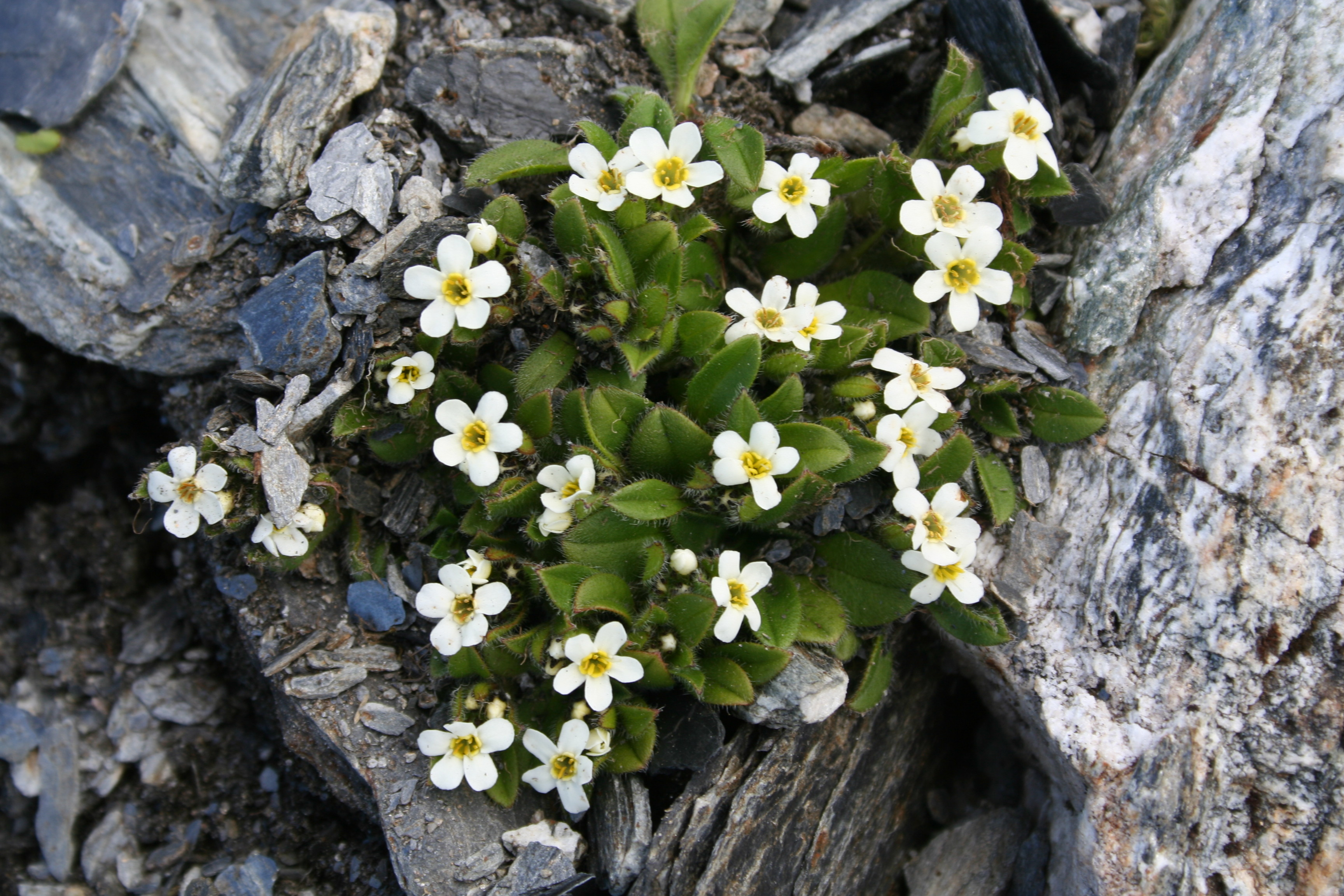
- Flowering Myosotis lyallii subsp. lyallii

Conservation status
- Naturally Uncommon (NZ TCS)

Scientific classification
- Kingdom: Plantae
- Clade: Tracheophytes
- Clade: Angiosperms
- Clade: Eudicots
- Clade: Asterids
- Order: Boraginales
- Family: Boraginaceae
- Genus: Myosotis
- Species: M. lyallii
- Subspecies: M. l. subsp. lyallii

Trinomial name
- Myosotis lyallii subsp. lyallii Hook.f.

Synonyms
- Myosotis lyallii var. lyallii; Myosotis lyallii var. townsonii (Cheeseman) L.B.Moore; Myosotis townsonii Cheeseman

= Myosotis lyallii subsp. lyallii =

Subspecies of flowering plant endemic to New Zealand

Myosotis lyallii subsp. lyallii is a subspecies of flowering plant in the family Boraginaceae, endemic to the South Island of New Zealand. Joseph Dalton Hooker described M. lyallii in 1853. Plants of this subspecies of forget-me-not are perennial with a prostrate habit, bracteate or partially-bracteate inflorescences, and white corollas, usually with exserted anthers.

== Taxonomy and etymology ==
Myosotis lyallii subsp. lyallii is in the plant family Boraginaceae. The species Myosotis lyallii was described in 1853 by Joseph Dalton Hooker in Flora Novae-Zelandiae.

The holotype specimen of Myosotis lyallii is lodged at Kew Herbarium (K000357221).

The specific epithet, lyallii, was chosen to honor David Lyall, who was Joseph Hooker's friend and fellow assistant surgeon on the Ross Expedition, and who collected the type specimen during that voyage.

This is one of two subspecies recognized in M. lyallii; the other is M. lyallii subsp. elderi. The subspecies are largely allopatric, as M. lyallii subsp. lyallii is generally found in the wet, western side of the main divide of the South Island, whereas M. lyallii subsp. elderi is generally found on the dry, eastern side. In M. lyallii subsp. lyallii, the anthers are usually wholly above the faucal scales (fully exserted), whereas in M. lyallii subsp. elderi, the anthers are at least partly below the faucal scales (partially exserted). Furthermore, M. lyallii subsp. lyallii has longer filaments (> 0.6 mm) and at least some inflorescences that are partially bracteate, compared to filaments < 0.6 mm long and inflorescences that are wholly bracteate in M. lyallii subsp. elderi.

== Phylogeny ==
To date, Myosotis lyallii subsp. lyallii has not been included in any published phylogenetic analyses using standard DNA sequencing markers (nuclear ribosomal DNA and chloroplast DNA regions).

== Description ==
Myosotis lyallii subsp. lyallii plants are rosettes that grow together forming loose clumps. The rosette leaves have petioles usually 3–18 mm long (rarely up to 40 mm long). The rosette leaf blades are 4–27 mm long by 2–13 mm wide (length: width ratio 1.1–3.6: 1), usually narrowly obovate to broadly obovate, usually widest at or above the middle, and usually with an obtuse apex. The upper surface of the leaf are densely covered in long, flexuous (sometimes curved), usually patent, antrorse (forward-facing) hairs that are oriented parallel to the mid vein; the leaf margin and petiole margin have patent to erect hairs. The lower surface of the leaf is similar except it can be glabrous or with isolated hairs on the midrib only. Each rosette has 1–19 prostrate or ascending, unbranched or once-branched, usually partially-bracteate inflorescences that are up to 105 mm long (rarely up to 230 mm long). The cauline leaves (sometimes called bracts) are similar to the rosette leaves but smaller, and decrease in size and become sessile toward the tip. Each inflorescence has 2–15 flowers, each borne on a short pedicel, and each usually with a bract. The calyx is 3–7 mm long at flowering and 4–8 mm long at fruiting, lobed to one-third to two-thirds its length, and densely covered in long, antrorse, mostly flexuous, appressed to patent hairs (sometimes mixed with retrorse or backward-facing hairs, or curved or rarely hooked hairs, on the calyx base). The corolla is white, up to 11 mm in diameter, with a cylindrical tube, petals that are broadly to very broadly ovate or obovate to very broadly obovate, and flat, and small yellow scales alternating with the petals. The anthers are 5–11 mm long and usually fully exserted or sometimes partially exserted, with the tips or upper quarter only surpassing the scales. The filaments are usually 1–2 mm long. The four smooth, shiny, light, medium or dark brown nutlets are 1.1–2.4 mm long by 0.6–1.5 mm wide and narrowly ovoid to ovoid in shape.

The chromosome number of M. lyallii subsp. lyallii is unknown.

M. lyallii subsp. lyallii has M. australis type pollen.

It flowers and fruits from December–March.

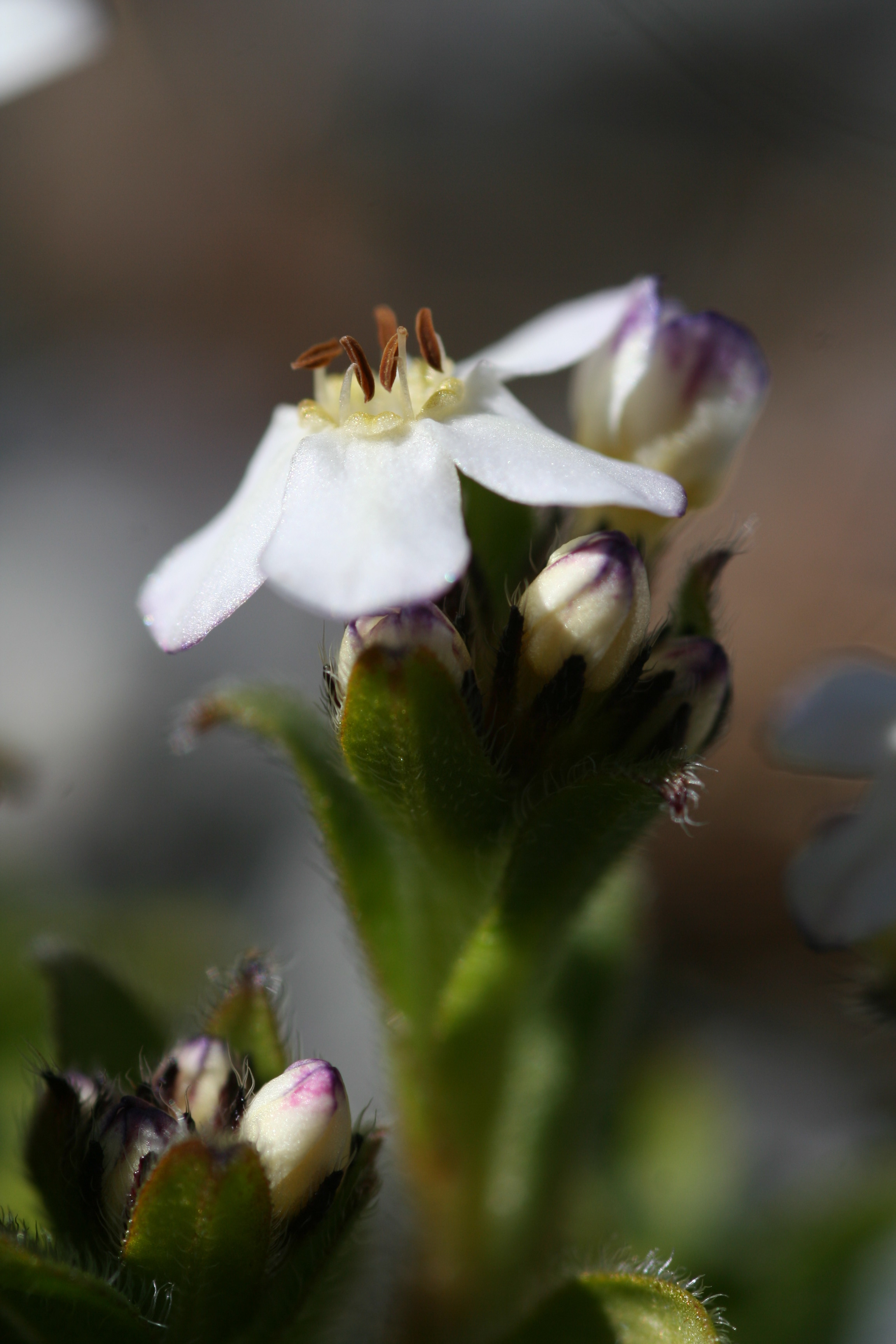
Floral detail

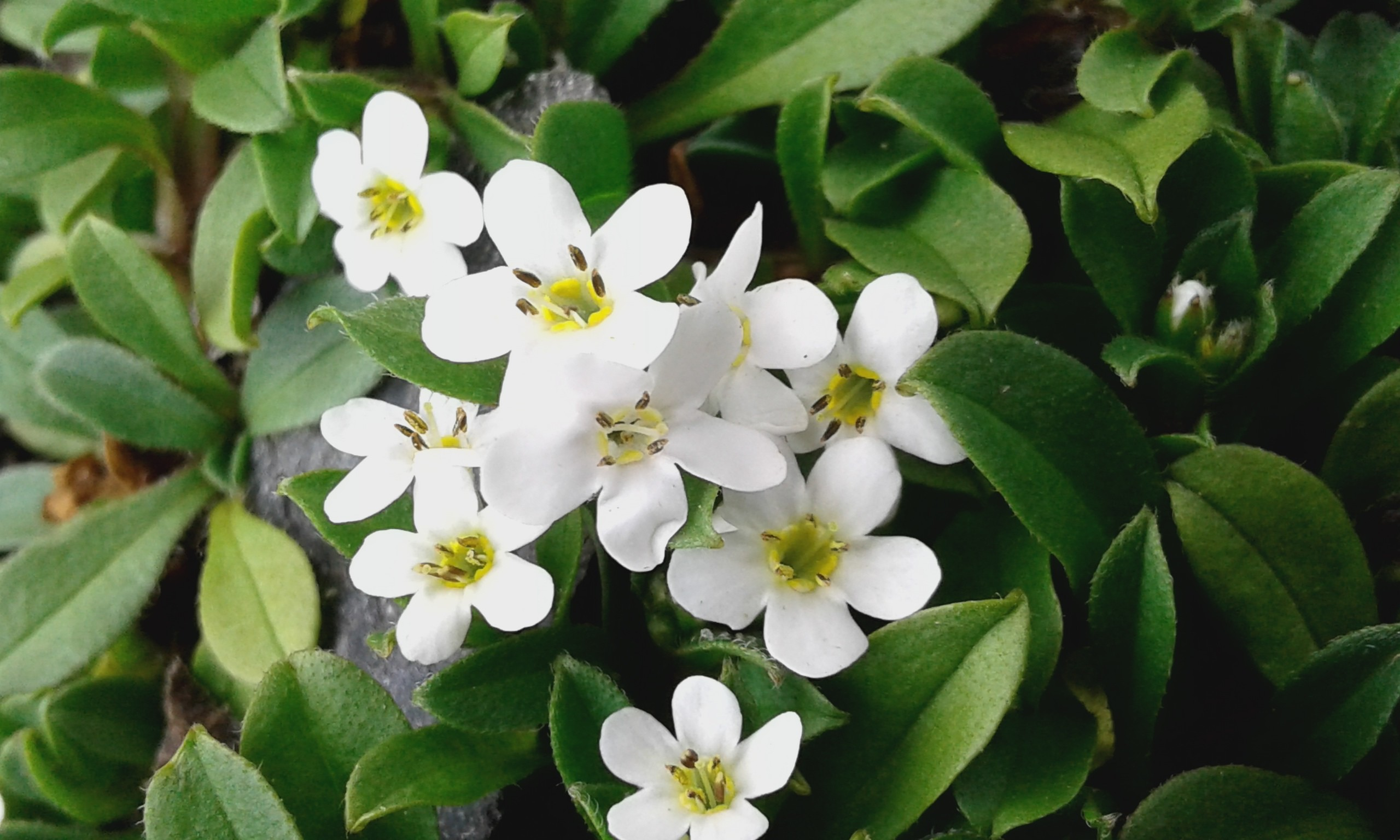
Flowers

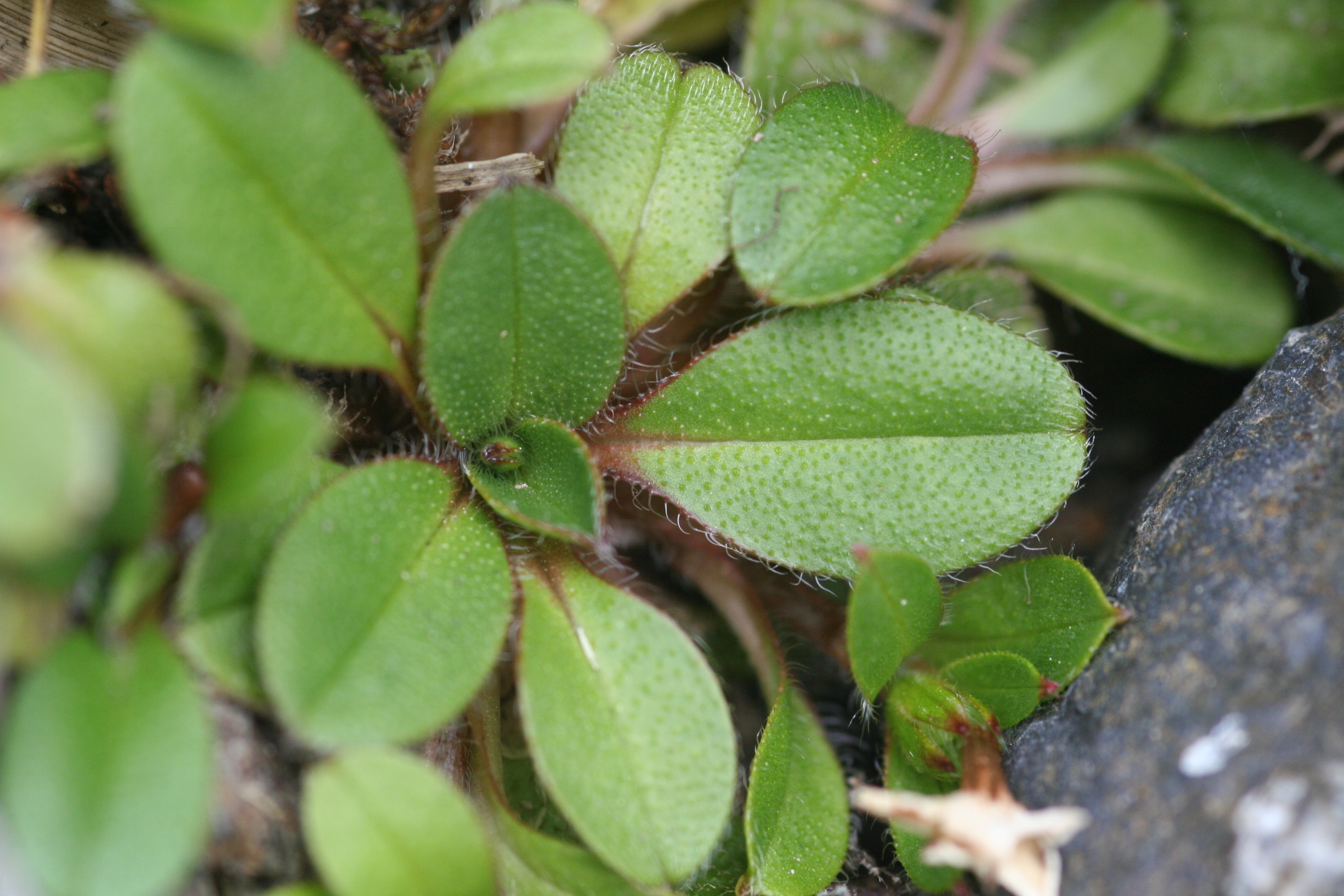
Rosette leaves

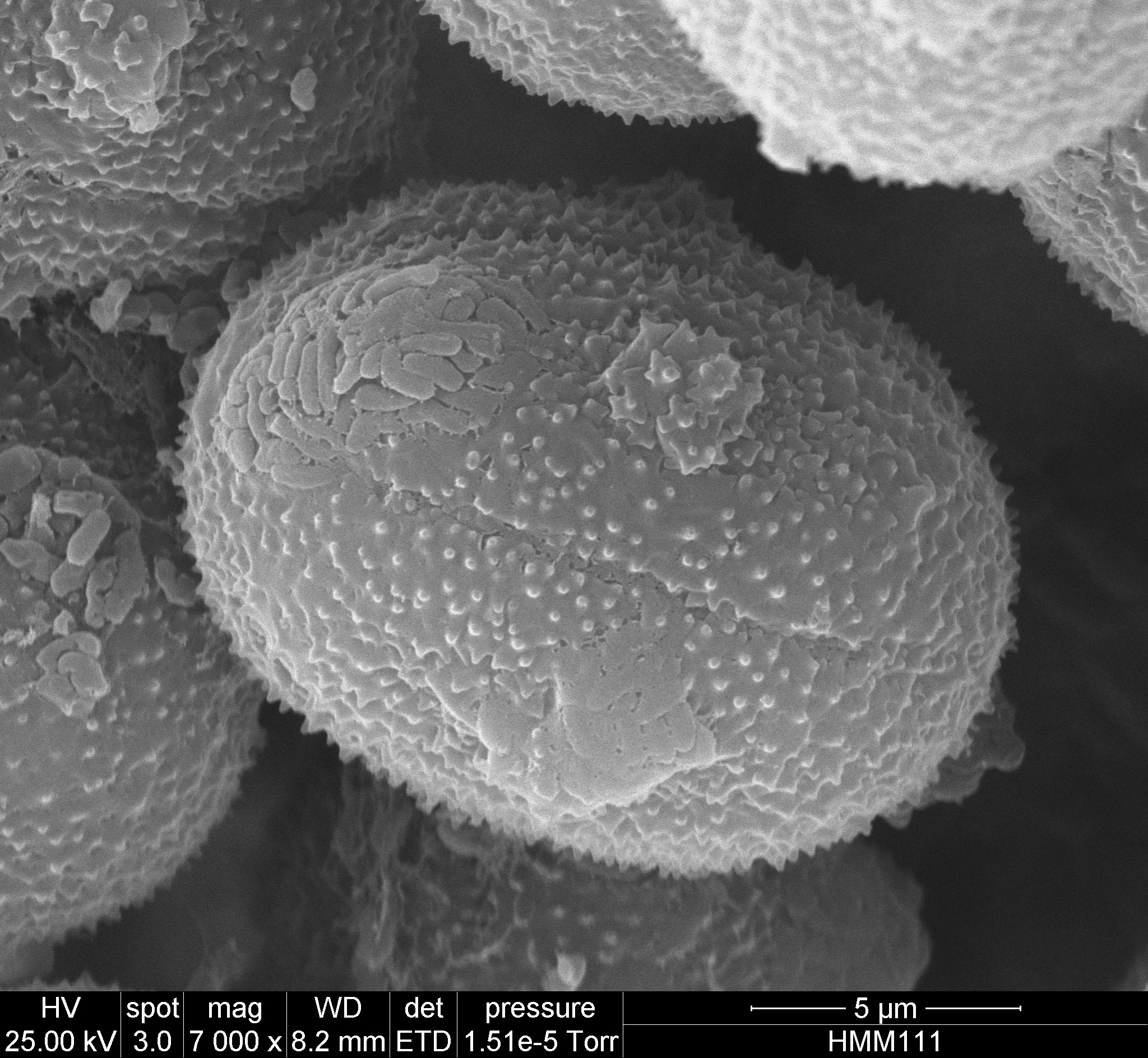
Pollen grain

== Distribution and habitat ==
Myosotis lyallii subsp. lyallii is a forget-me-not endemic to the mountains of western areas of the South Island New Zealand from 900–1980 m ASL in the following ecological districts: Western Nelson, Westland, Canterbury, and Fiordland. M. lyallii subsp. lyallii is an occasional plant in exposed, steep, rocky sites in fellfields and tussock-herbfields.

== Conservation status ==
Myosotis lyallii subsp. lyallii is listed as "At Risk - Naturally Uncommon", with the qualifiers "DP" (Data Poor) and "Sp" (Sparse) in the most recent assessment (2017-2018) under the New Zealand Threatened Classification system for plants.
