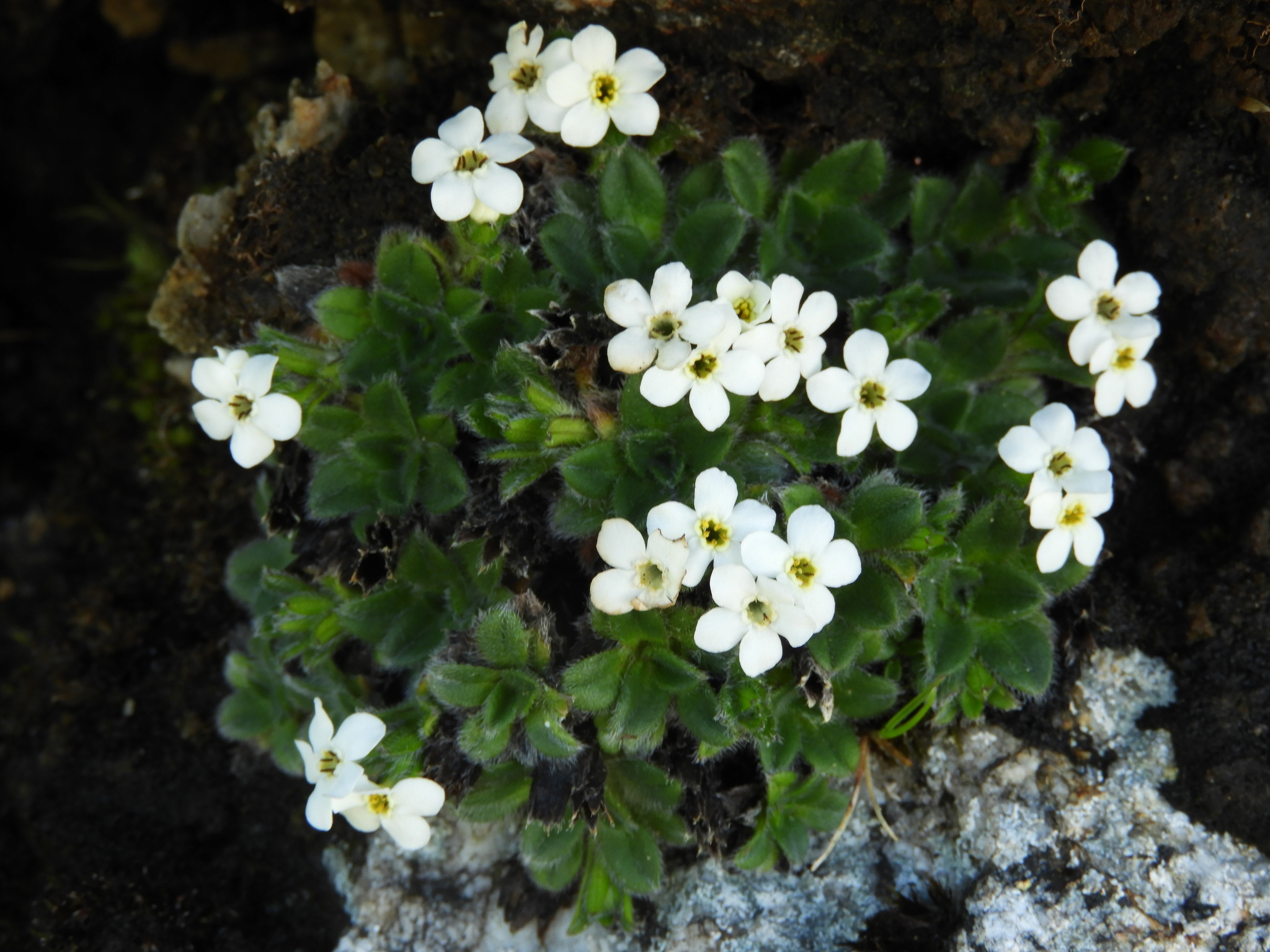

Conservation status
- Naturally Uncommon (NZ TCS)

Scientific classification
- Kingdom: Plantae
- Clade: Tracheophytes
- Clade: Angiosperms
- Clade: Eudicots
- Clade: Asterids
- Order: Boraginales
- Family: Boraginaceae
- Genus: Myosotis
- Species: M. retrorsa

Binomial name
- Myosotis retrorsa Meudt, Prebble and Hindm.-Walls

= Myosotis retrorsa =

Species of flowering plant

Myosotis retrorsa is a species of flowering plant in the family Boraginaceae, endemic to the South Island of New Zealand. Heidi Meudt, Jessica Prebble and Rowan Hindmarsh-Walls described the species. Plants of this species of forget-me-not are perennial with a prostrate habit, bracteate inflorescences, and white corollas.

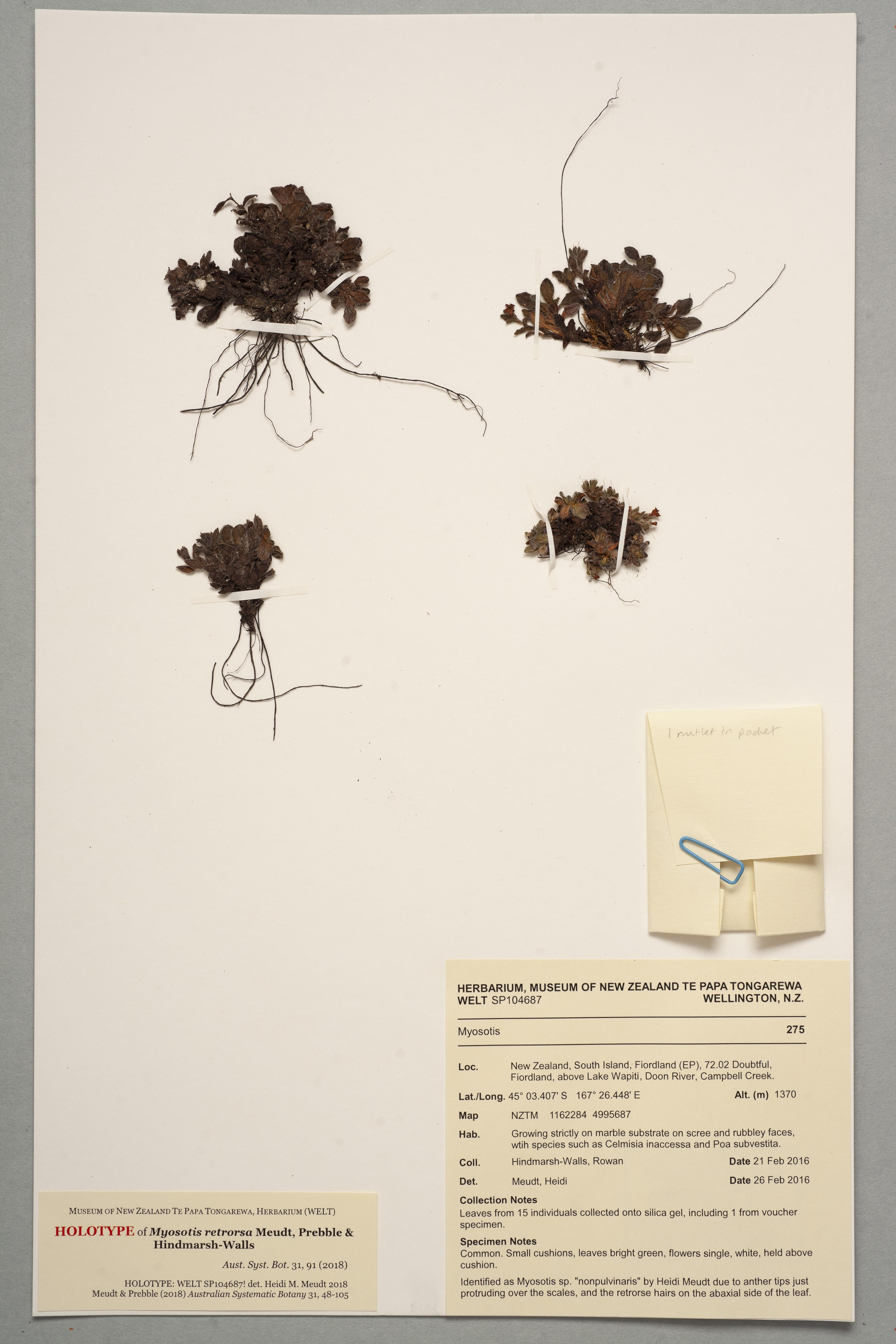
Holotype specimen of Myosotis retrorsa

== Description ==
Myosotis retrorsa plants are single rosettes that may cluster together into tufts or loose clumps.. The rosette leaves are 7–30 per plant, and have petioles 2–9 mm long. The rosette leaf blades are 4–7 mm long by 1–4 mm wide (length: width ratio 0.8–1.7: 1), narrowly obovate to very broadly obovate, or orbicular, widest at or above the middle, with an obtuse apex. The upper surface of the leaf is densely covered in flexuous, appressed to patent, antrorse (forward-facing) hairs that are parallel to the mid vein. The lower surface of the leaf is sparsely to densely covered in flexuous, appressed to patent, retrorse (backward-facing) hairs, sometimes mixed with antrorse hairs, that are parallel or angled relative to the mid vein. Each rosette has 2–15 ascending or prostrate, unbranched or branched, bracteate inflorescences that are usually 20–40 cm long. The cauline leaves are similar in size, shape and hairs to the rosette leaves. There can be up to 3 flowers in each inflorescence, each one borne on a short pedicel and with a cauline leaf. The calyx is 3–6 mm long at flowering and 5–8 mm long at fruiting, lobed to up to half of its length, and densely covered in short, flexuous, appressed to patent, antrorse hairs and some retrorse hairs near the calyx base. The corolla is white and up to 8 mm in diameter, with a cylindrical tube, petals that are broadly obovate and flat, and small yellow scales alternating with the petals. The anthers are partly exserted, with the tips or the upper third only surpassing the scales. The four smooth, shiny, brown to dark brown nutlets are 1.3–2.2 mm long by 0.8–1.2 mm wide and narrowly ovoid to ovoid in shape.

Myosotis retrorsa showed intraspecific variation for pollen type, with either M. australis or M. uniflora type pollen.

The chromosome number of M. retrorsa is unknown.

It flowers and fruits mainly from December to February.

== Taxonomy and etymology ==
Myosotis retrorsa Meudt et al. is in the plant family Boraginaceae and was originally described in 2018 by Heid Meudt, Jessica Prebble and Rowan Hindmarsh-Walls. It is morphologically most similar to M. pulvinaris and M. lyallii, other bracteate-prostrate species of Myosotis. Myosotis retrorsa can be distinguished from all other bracteate-prostrate species by the retrorse trichomes on the underside of the rosette and cauline leaves, and calyx. Its rosette leaf lamina length : width ratio < 1.3 : 1 can distinguish it from several species including M. lyallii (but not M. pulvinaris). M. retrorsa has 1–3 flowers per inflorescence compared to the solitary flowers of M. pulvinaris and the larger inflorescences of M. lyallii, which have (2–)4–11 flowers.

The type specimen of Myosotis retrorsa is lodged at the herbarium (WELT) of the Museum of New Zealand, Te Papa Tongarewa.

The specific epithet, retrorsa, is derived from the Latin word retrorsus (backward-facing) and is a nod to the characteristic retrorse trichomes on the underside of the rosette leaves.

== Distribution and habitat ==
Myosotis retrorsa is endemic to the South Island of New Zealand in Otago, Southland and Fiordland from 915 to 1830 m elevation. It is found in subalpine outcrops, crevices, and fellfield ridges and cirques on schist, marble.

== Phylogeny ==
Myosotis retrorsa was not included in phylogenetic analyses of standard DNA sequencing markers (nuclear ribosomal DNA and chloroplast DNA regions).

A 2025 phylogenomic study based on DNA from whole plastids, target capture of universal angiosperm bait markers, and the full nuclear ribosomal DNA cistron, included five individuals of M. retrorsa. In that study, M. retrorsa was one of 12 taxa that were always polyphyletic in all three data sets, being found in two or three different clades in each tree, often with individuals from other species from the same geographic region.

== Gallery ==
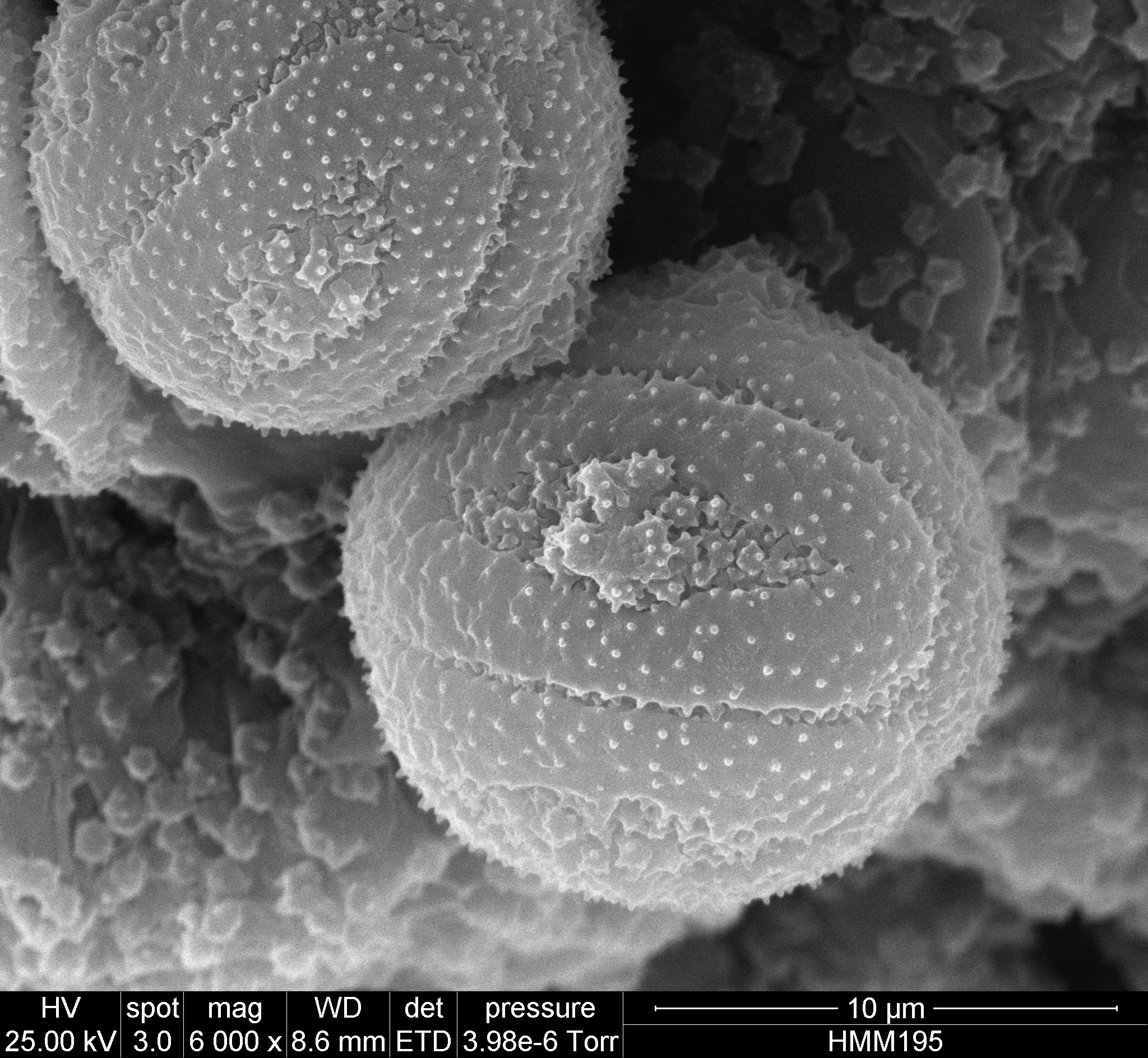
Pollen

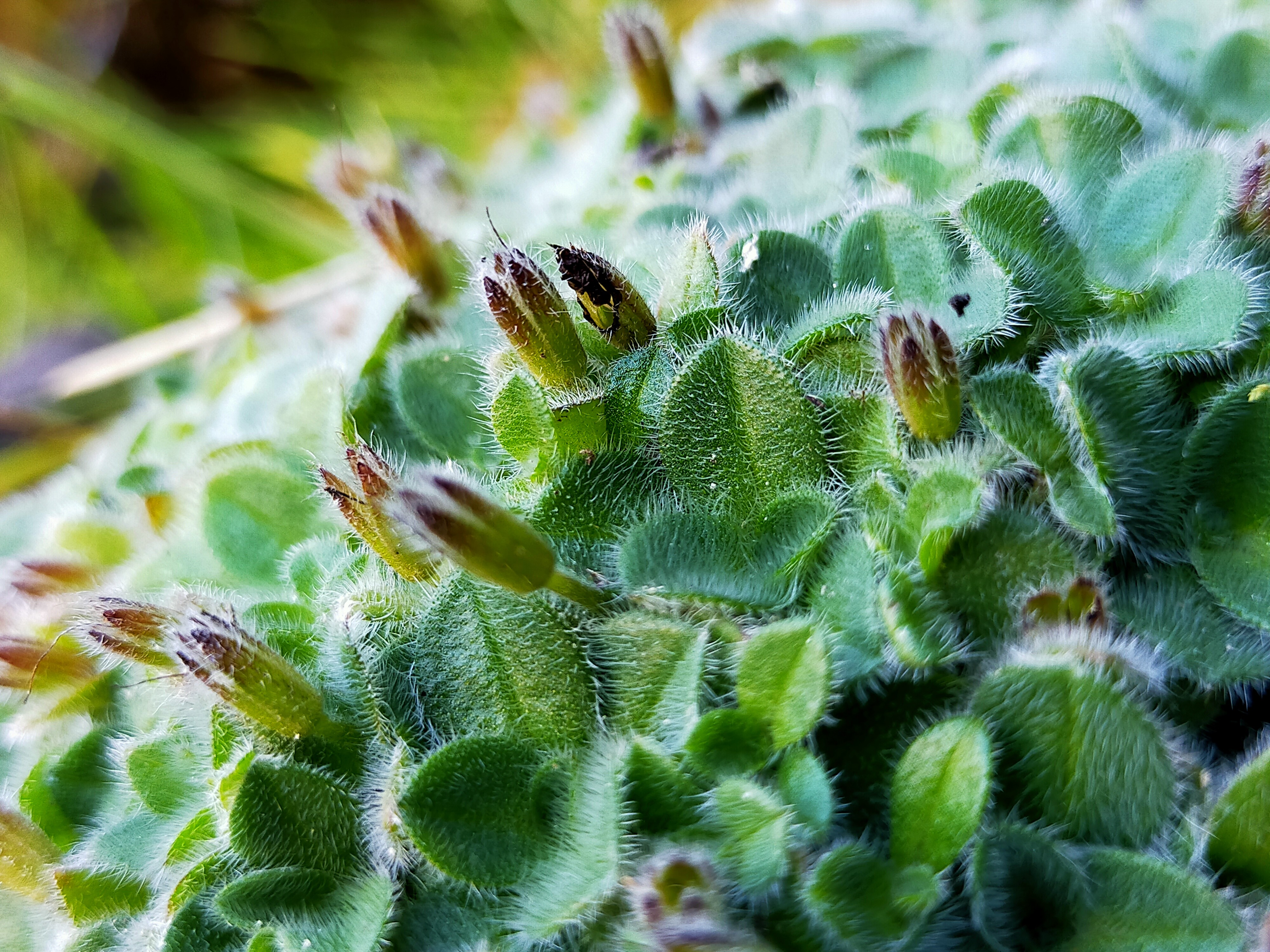
Close up of hairy leaves and calyces

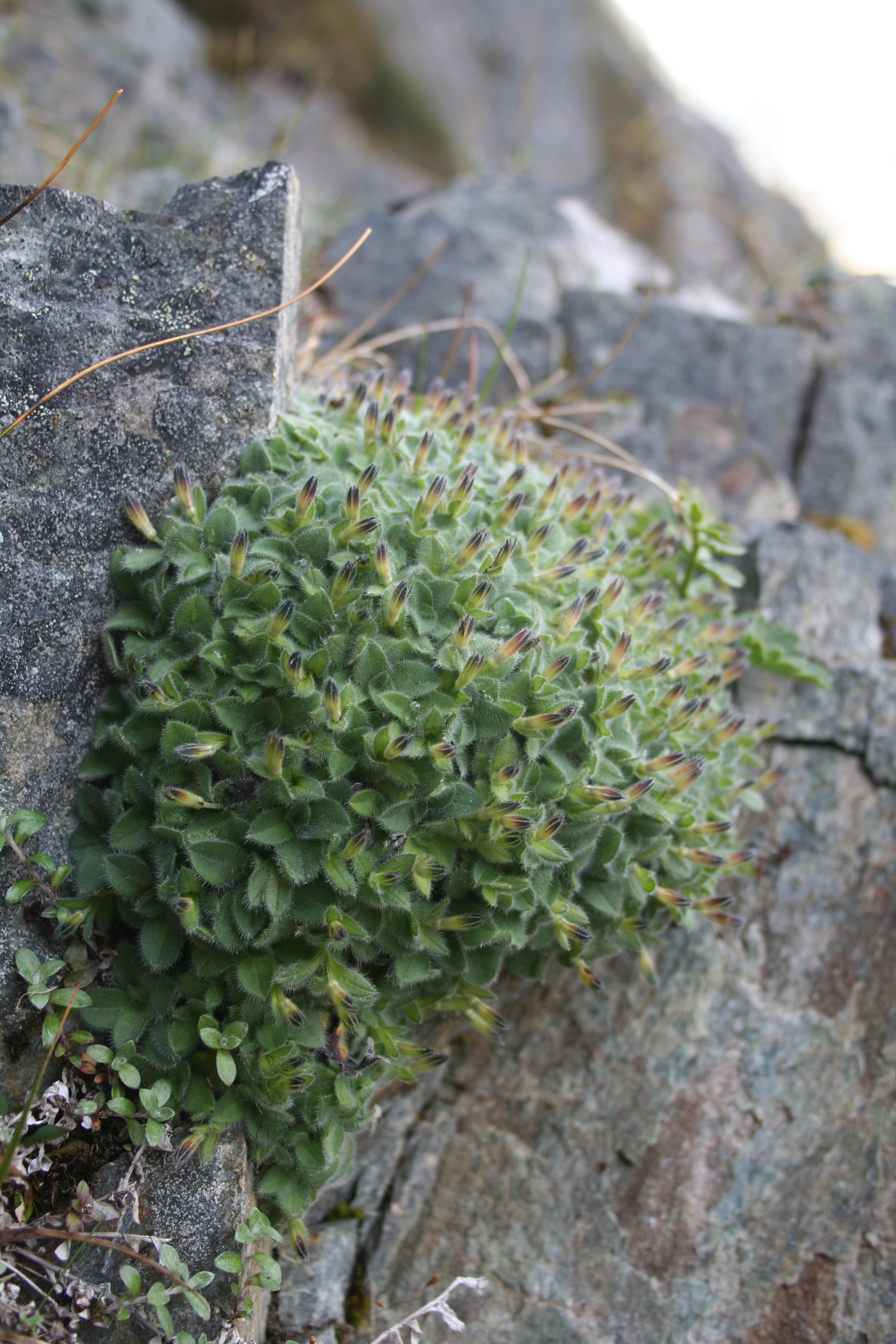
Plant just past flowering growing on rock

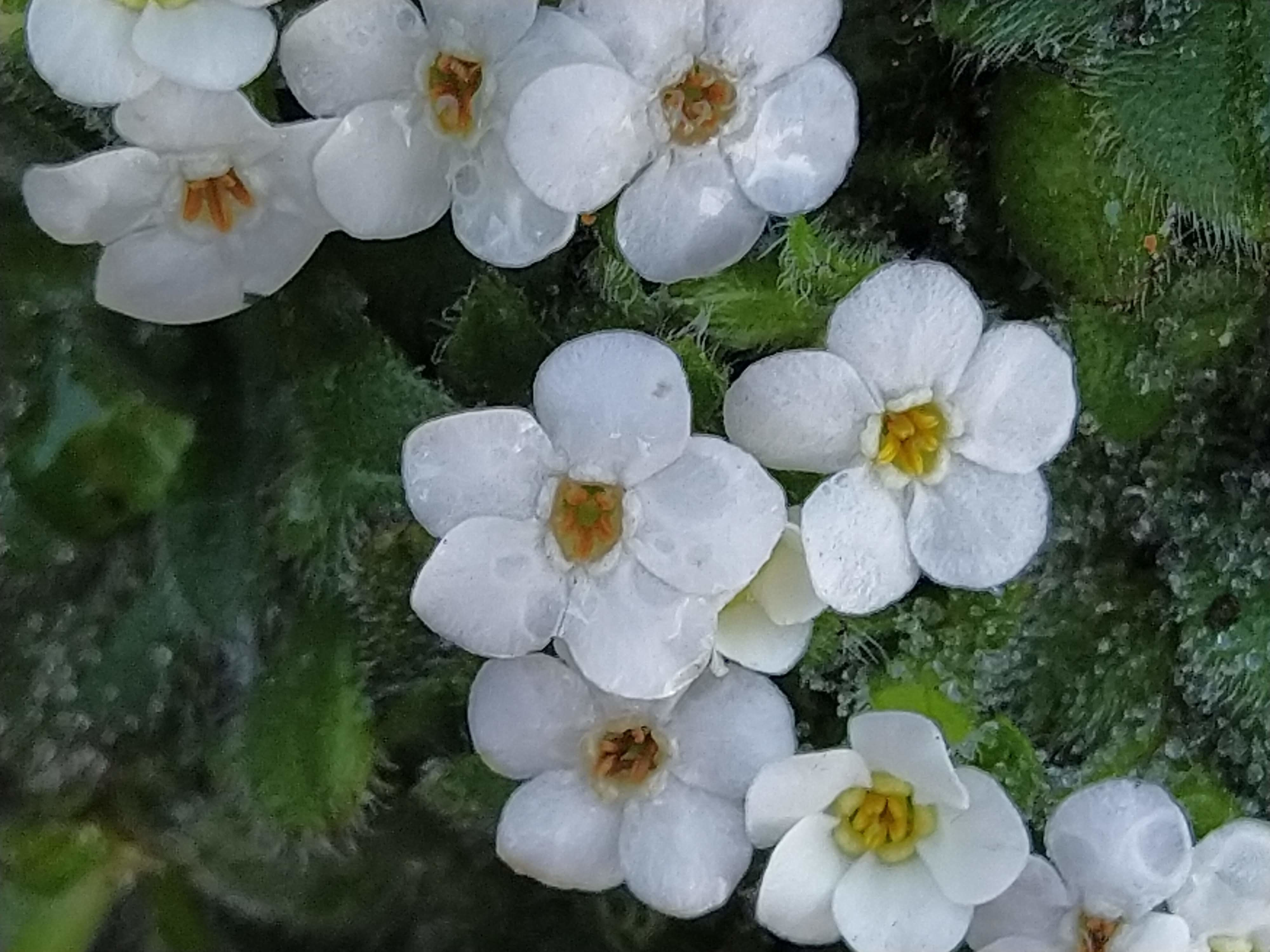
Close-up of flowers

== Cultivation ==
Although not commonly cultivated, plants of Myosotis retrorsa have been cultivated at the Arctic-Alpine Botanic Garden in Tromsø, Norway.

== Conservation status ==
The species is listed as At Risk - Naturally Uncommon in the most recent assessment (2023) of the New Zealand Threatened Classification for plants, which was unchanged from the previous assessment. It also has the qualifier "Sp" (Sparse).
