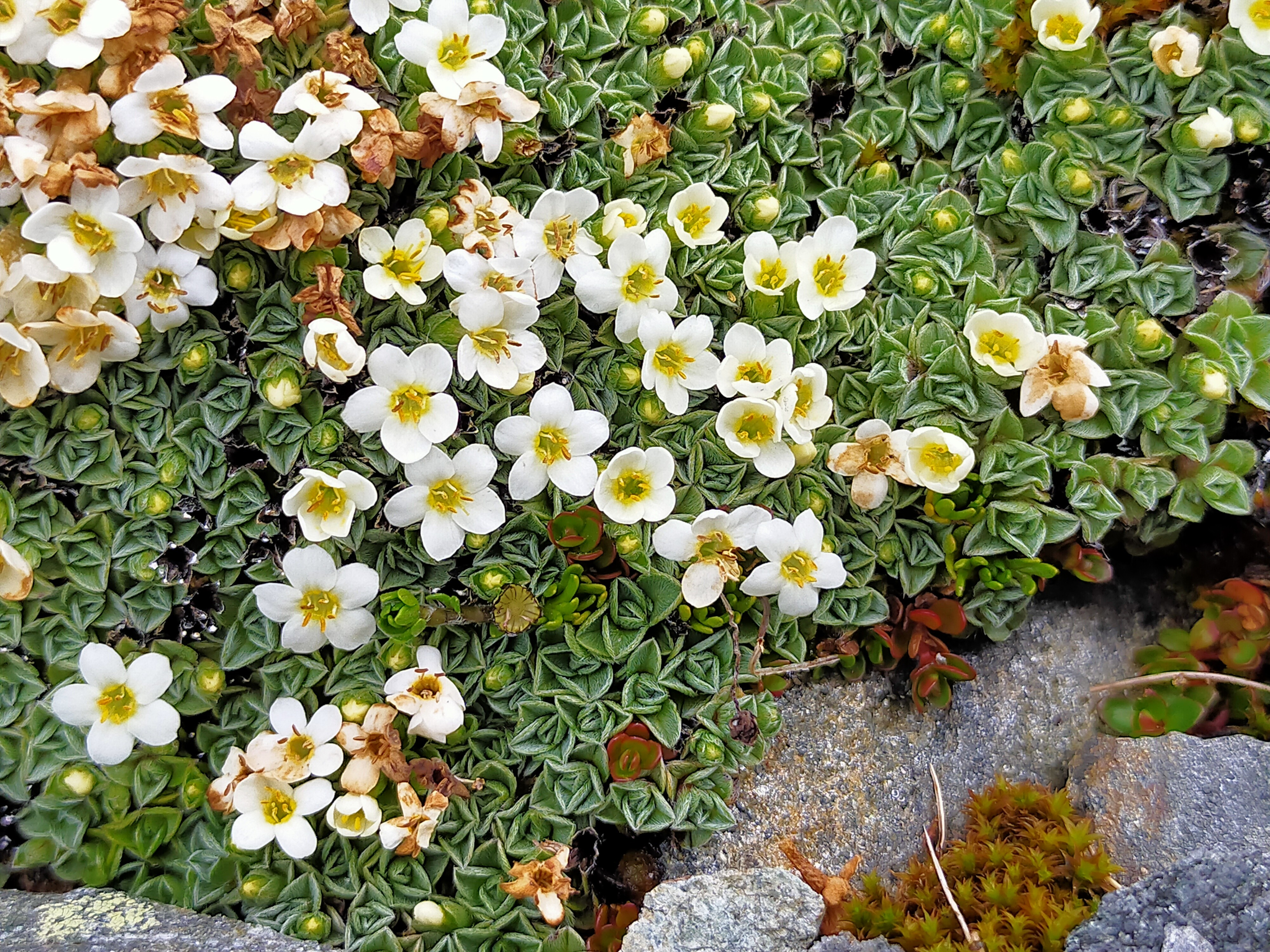
- Flowering plant of Myosotis glabrescens

Conservation status
- Data Deficit (NZ TCS)

Scientific classification
- Kingdom: Plantae
- Clade: Tracheophytes
- Clade: Angiosperms
- Clade: Eudicots
- Clade: Asterids
- Order: Boraginales
- Family: Boraginaceae
- Genus: Myosotis
- Species: M. glabrescens

Binomial name
- Myosotis glabrescens L.B.Moore

= Myosotis glabrescens =

Species of flowering plant

Myosotis glabrescens is a species of flowering plant in the family Boraginaceae, endemic to the South Island of New Zealand. Lucy Moore described the species in 1961. Plants of this species of forget-me-not are tightly compacted, perennial mats with bracteate inflorescences and white corollas.

== Taxonomy and etymology ==
Myosotis glabrescens L.B.Moore is in the plant family Boraginaceae and was originally described in 1961 by Lucy Moore. M. glabrescens is morphologically most similar to the common cushion species, M. pulvinaris, but can be distinguished from it (and indeed many other bracteate-prostrate species) by numerous floral characters, including its long, exserted filaments (> 0.5 mm long) which are attached at the faucal scales, its long anthers (0.9–1.1 mm long) which are completely exserted past the faucal scales, and its long calyx lobes which are longer than half the length of the calyx.

The type specimen of Myosotis glabrescens is lodged at the Museum of New Zealand Te Papa Tongarewa, Wellington (herbarium WELT).

The specific epithet, glabrescens, is derived from the Latin words glaber, meaning hairless or smooth, and the suffix -escens, meaning becoming or resembling. The leaf hairs of M. glabrescens are ‘early deciduous’ and ‘soon falling so that most of plant is glab[rous]’.

== Phylogeny ==
Myosotis glabrescens was shown to be a part of the monophyletic southern hemisphere lineage of Myosotis in phylogenetic analyses of standard DNA sequencing markers (nuclear ribosomal DNA and chloroplast DNA regions). Within the southern hemisphere lineage, species relationships were not well resolved.

== Description ==
Myosotis glabrescens plants are rosettes tightly compacted into mats that may reach 1m in diameter. The rosette leaves have petioles 1–2 mm long. The rosette leaf blades are 2–3 mm long by 2–5 mm wide (length: width ratio 0.6–1.3: 1), broadly ovate, very broadly ovate, rotund or circular, widest at or below the middle, with an obtuse apex. Both surfaces of the leaf are sparsely to densely covered in straight (mostly) or flexuous, appressed (mostly) or patent, antrorse (forward-facing) hairs that are parallel to the mid vein, whereas the petiole is glabrous on the upper surface. Each rosette has a few prostrate to ascending, once-branched, bracteate, single-flowered inflorescences that are 29–46 mm long. The cauline leaves are very similar to the rosette leaves. The solitary flowers are borne on a short pedicel with a bract. The calyx is 3–4 mm long at flowering and c. 4 mm long at fruiting, lobed to about two-thirds of its length, and densely covered in straight (rarely flexuous), appressed to patent, antrorse hairs. The corolla is white and 4–6 mm in diameter, with a cylindrical tube, petals that are obovate to ovate and flat, and small yellow scales alternating with the petals. The anthers are fully exserted. The four smooth, shiny, medium brown nutlets are 1.6–1.8 mm long by c. 0.9 mm wide and narrowly ovoid to ovoid in shape.

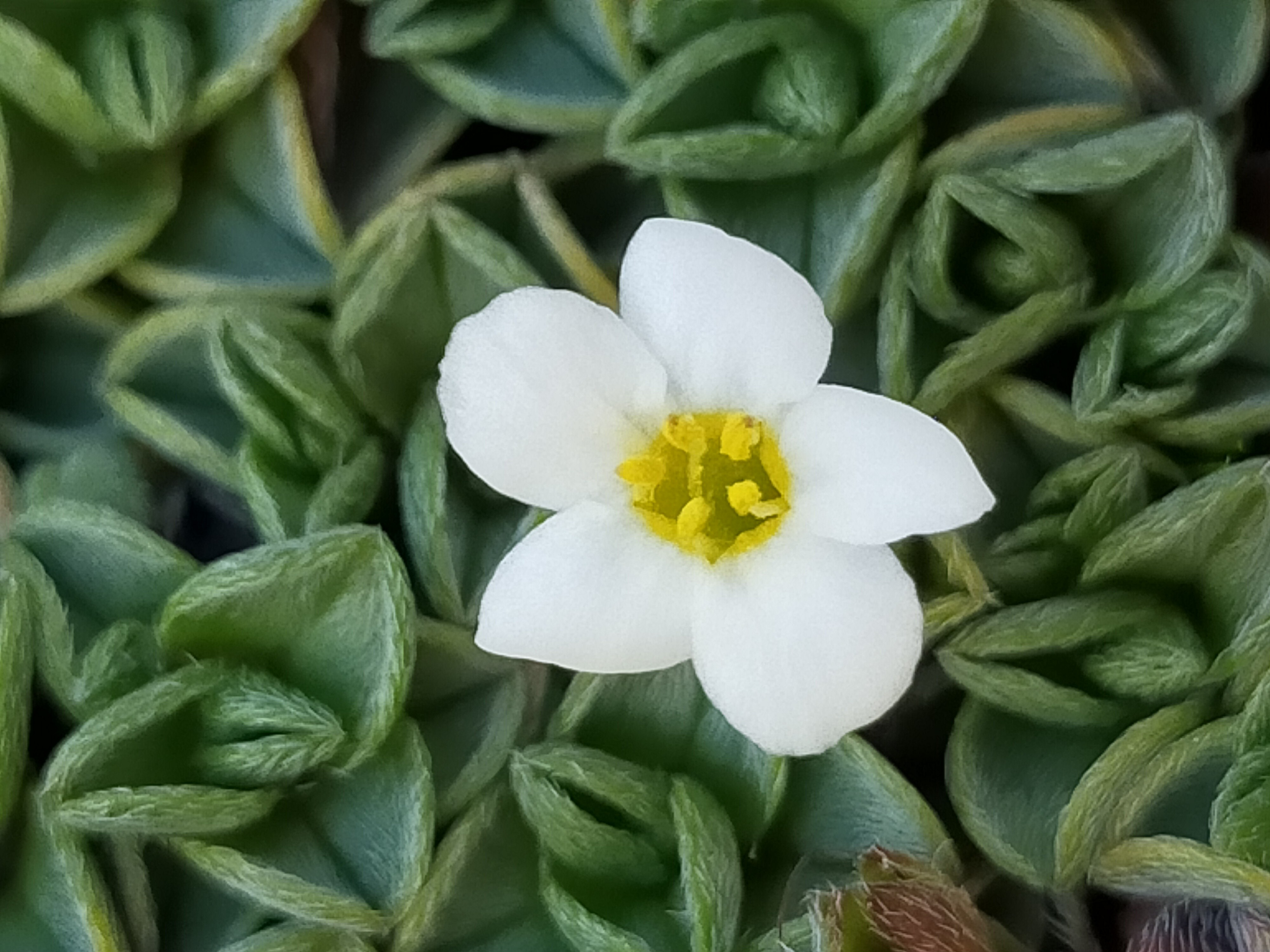
Floral detail

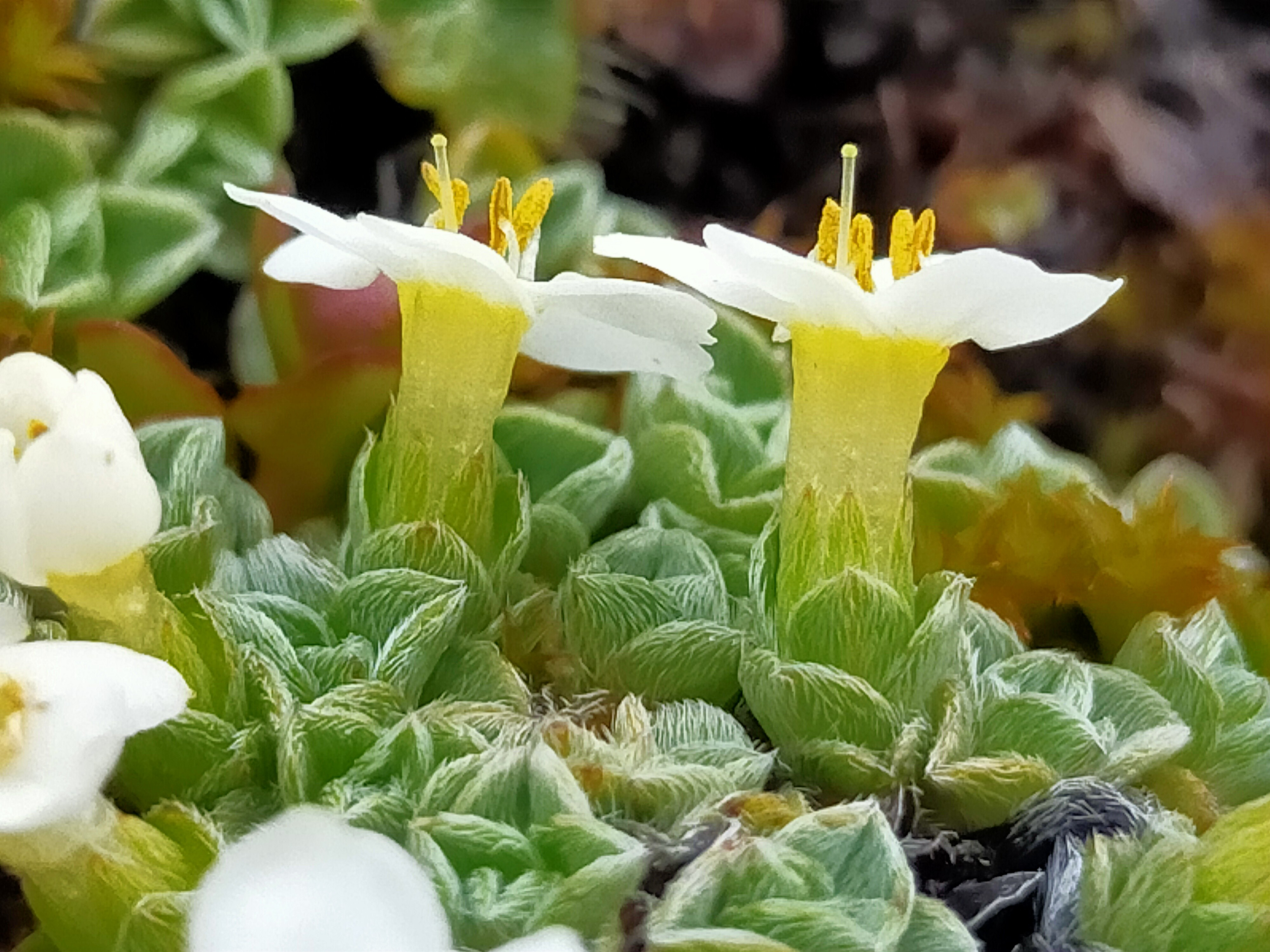
Flowers side on

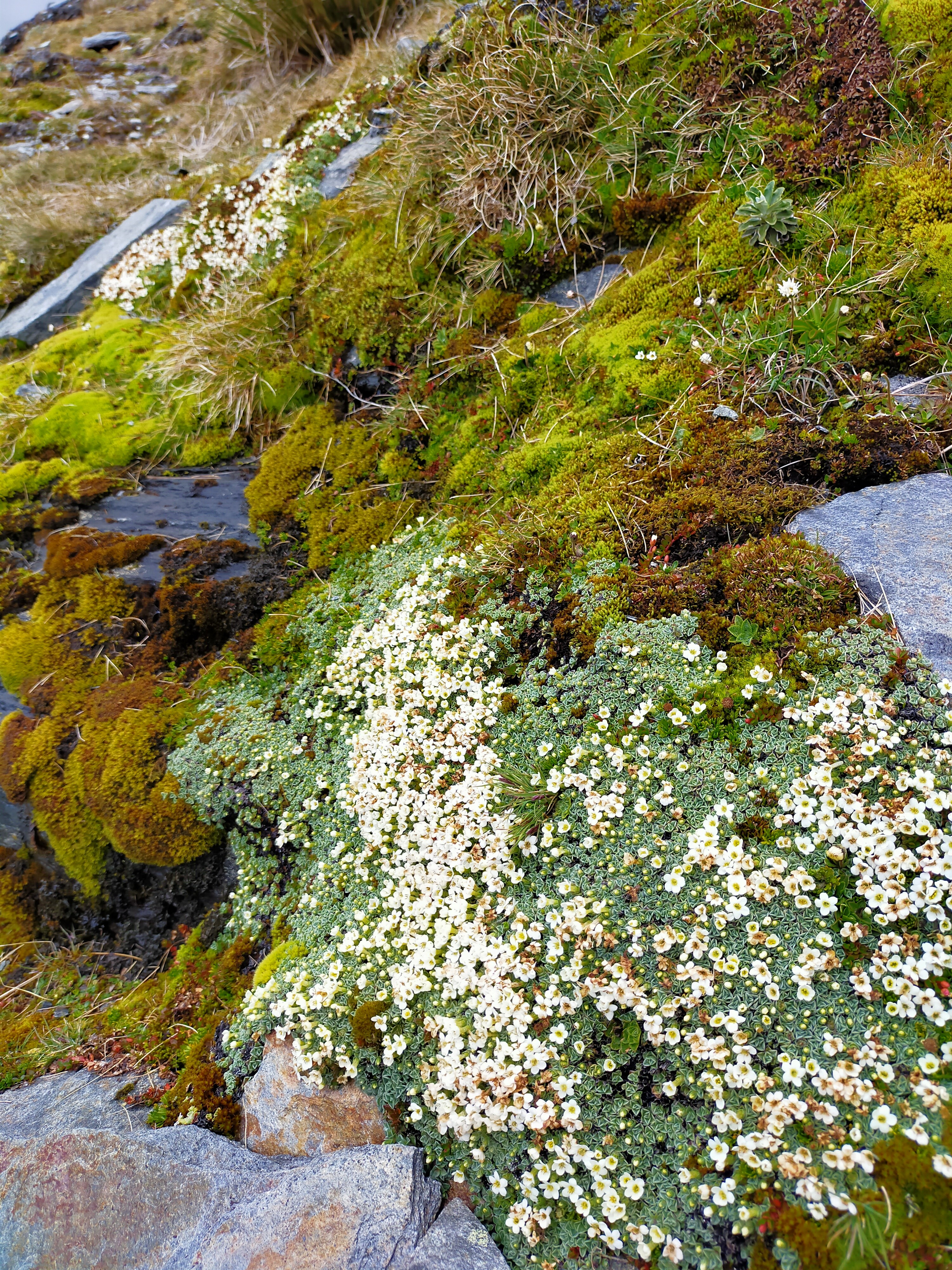
Growth habit and habitat

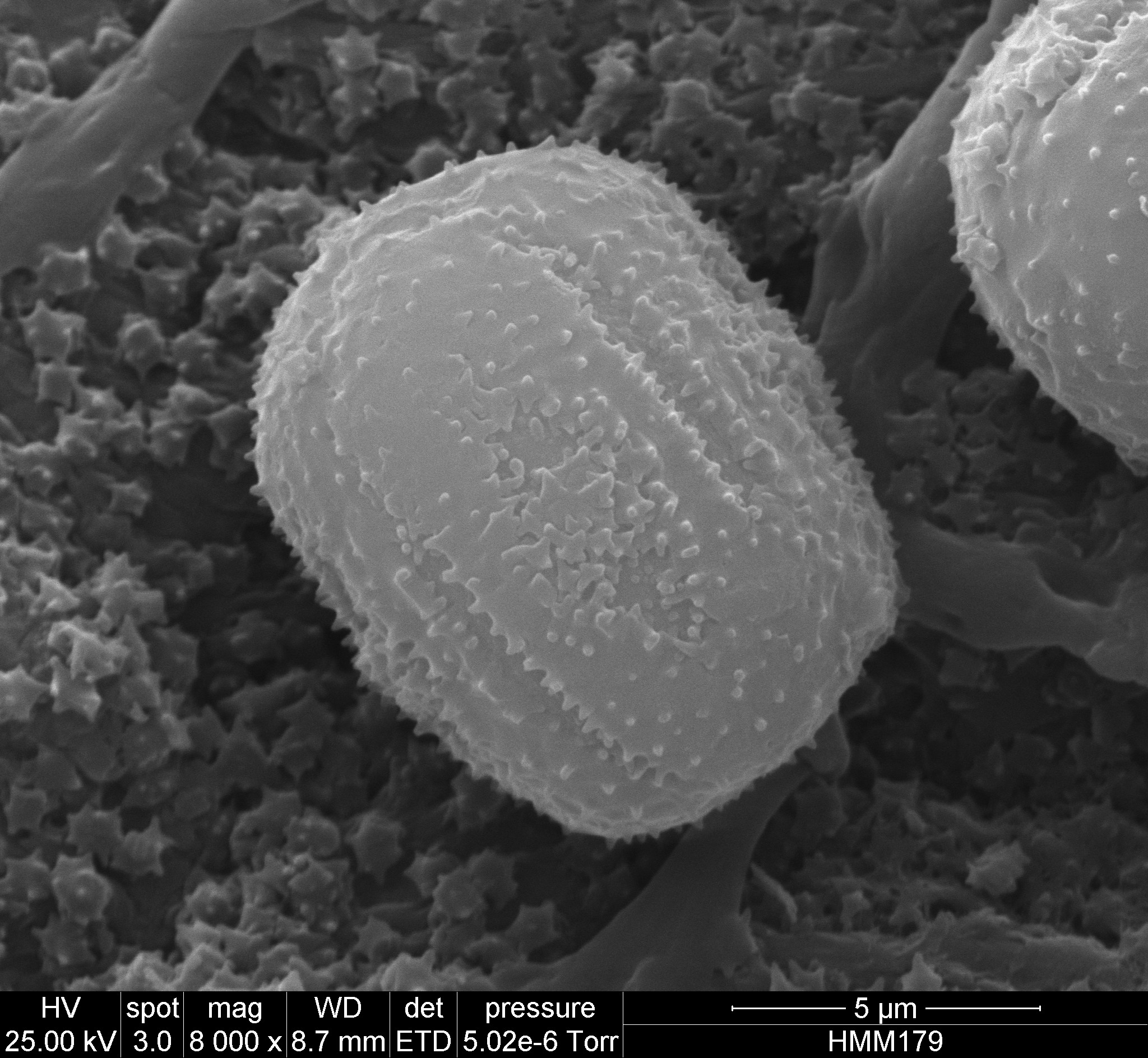
Pollen grain

Myosotis glabrescens has M. angustata type pollen.

The chromosome number of M. glabrescens is unknown.

Myosotis glabrescens flowers and fruits from January–February.

== Distribution and habitat ==
Myosotis glabrescens is endemic to the South Island of New Zealand in Otago, from 1400 to 1830 m ASL. M. glabrescens is found in wet areas including stream headwaters in high-elevation, subalpine shingle banks.

== Conservation status ==
The species is listed as Data Deficient in the most recent assessment (2017–2018) of the New Zealand Threatened Classification for plants. At least one new population has been found since that listing.
