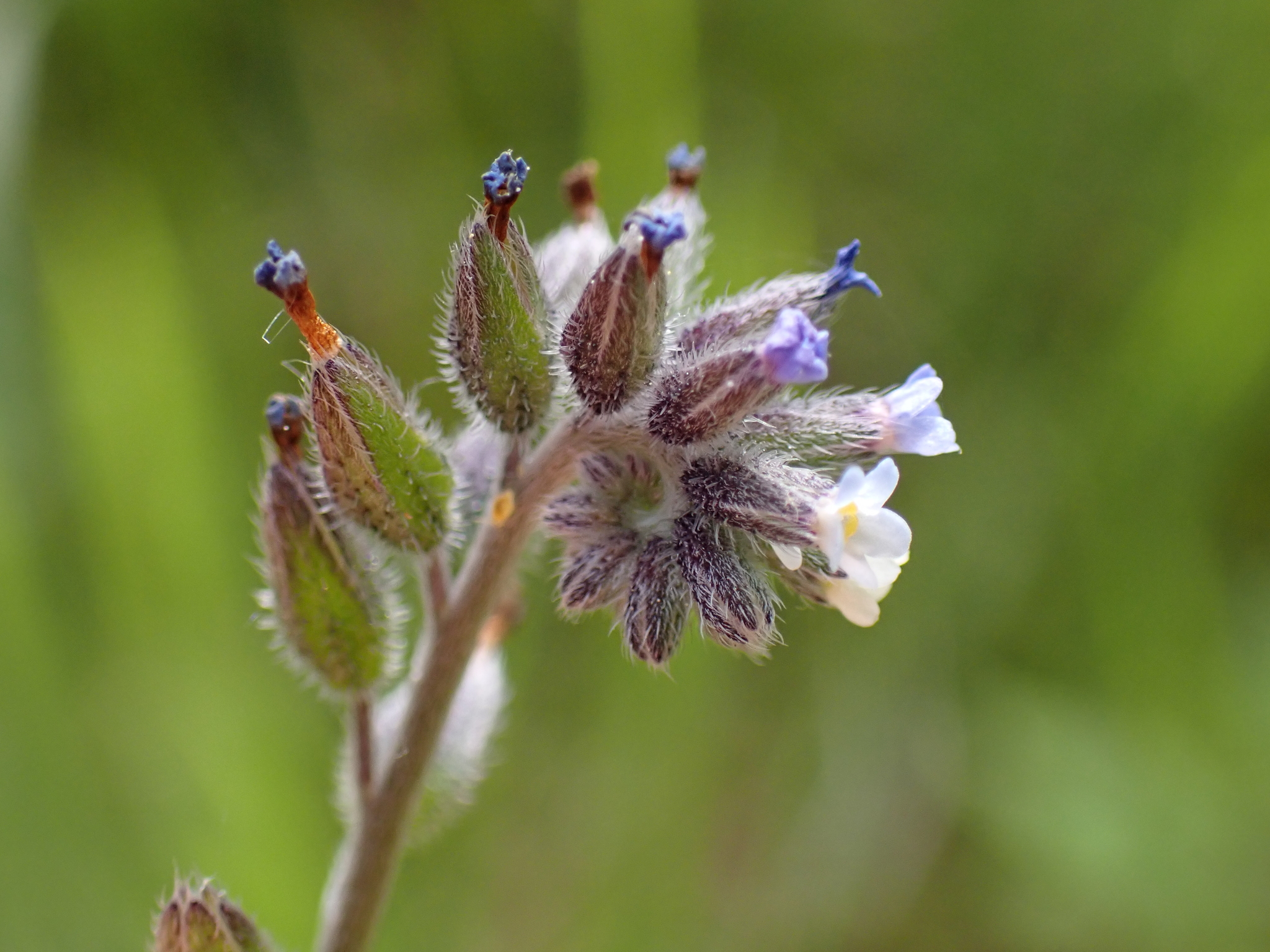

Scientific classification
- Kingdom: Plantae
- Clade: Tracheophytes
- Clade: Angiosperms
- Clade: Eudicots
- Clade: Asterids
- Order: Boraginales
- Family: Boraginaceae
- Genus: Myosotis
- Species: M. dubia

Binomial name
- Myosotis dubia (Arrond.) Blaise

= Myosotis dubia =

Species of forget-me-not

Myosotis dubia is a species of forget-me-not in the family Boraginaceae. It was previously considered a subspecies of the changing forget-me-not (Myosotis discolor), until recent genetic work discovered the two species to have different chromosome ploidy, where Myosotis dubia was found to be diploid, while M. discolor was hexaploid.

== Description ==
The plants are 15 to 65 cm tall with several side branches and spreading hairs that extend all the way to the top leaf. The inflorescence features small flowers coiled in a scorpioid pattern, where the petals start off pure white, changing to blue as they mature. The leaves follow an alternate arrangement, and are linear to oblong in shape. Each mature flower produces four nutlets.
