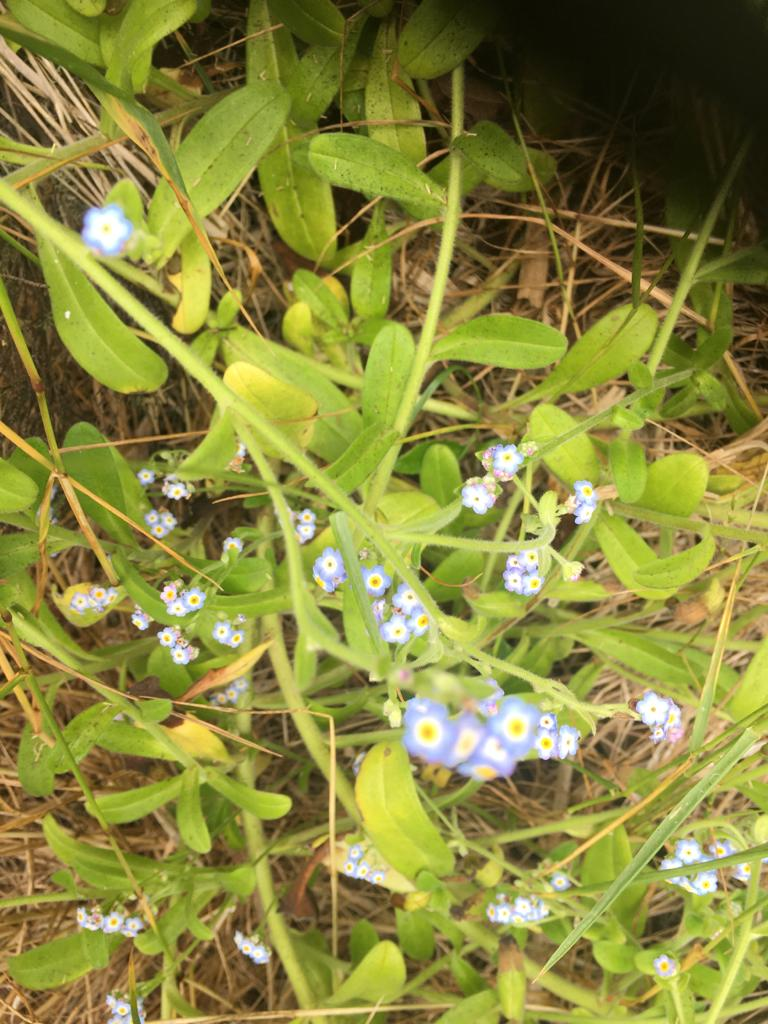

Scientific classification
- Kingdom: Plantae
- Clade: Tracheophytes
- Clade: Angiosperms
- Clade: Eudicots
- Clade: Asterids
- Order: Boraginales
- Family: Boraginaceae
- Genus: Myosotis
- Species: M. maritima

Binomial name
- Myosotis maritima Hochst. ex Seub.

= Myosotis maritima =

Species of plant

Myosotis maritima is a species of flowering plant in the family Boraginaceae endemic to the Azores. It is found in rocks, cliffs and coastal landslides, at altitudes generally below 50 m (160 ft) (on the island of Flores, however, there are populations at altitudes close to 200 m (660 ft)). It is present in all of the islands.
