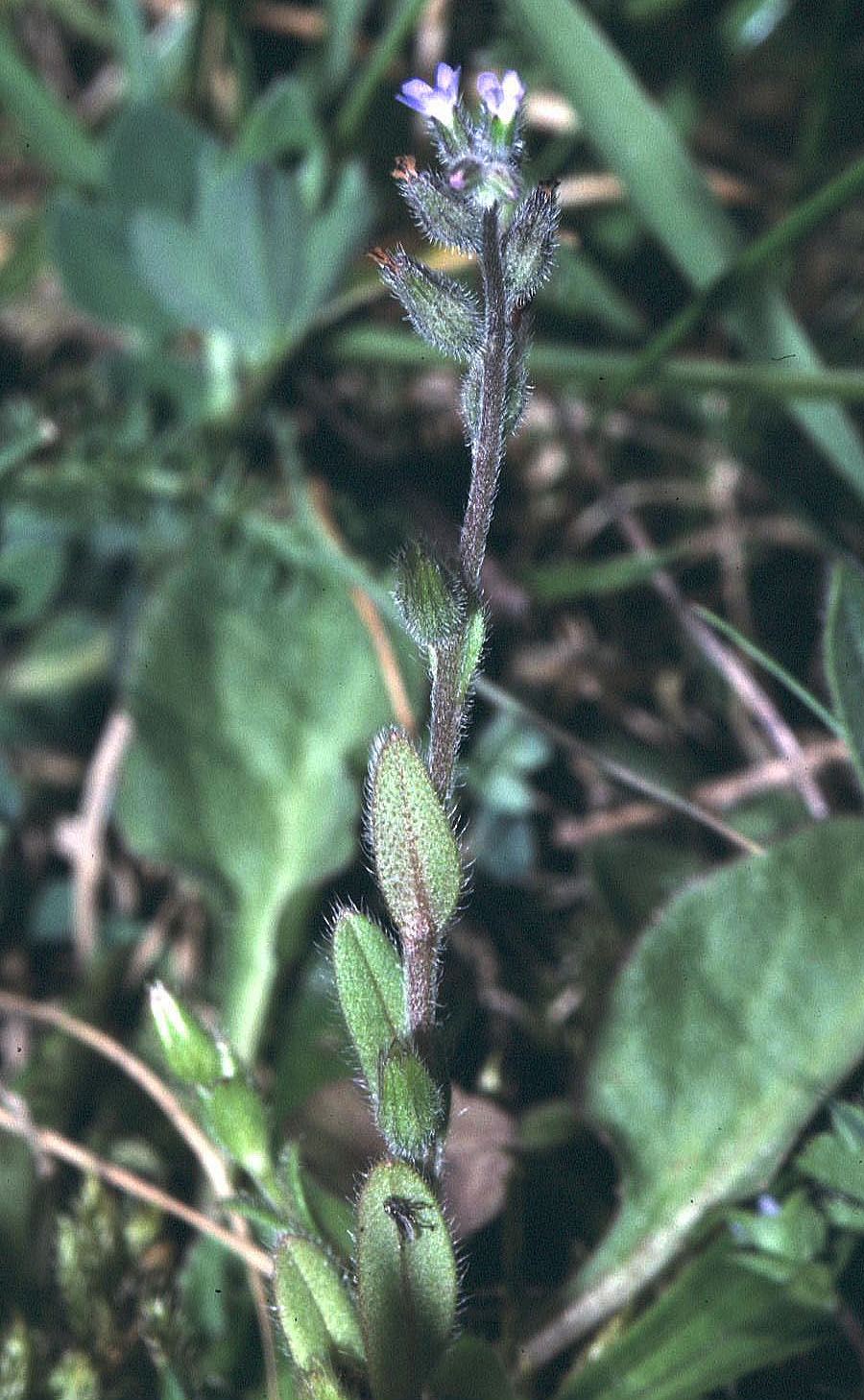

Scientific classification
- Kingdom: Plantae
- Clade: Tracheophytes
- Clade: Angiosperms
- Clade: Eudicots
- Clade: Asterids
- Order: Boraginales
- Family: Boraginaceae
- Genus: Myosotis
- Species: M. stricta

Binomial name
- Myosotis stricta Link ex Roem. & Schult.

Synonyms
- Myosotis arenaria Schrad.; Myosotis micrantha Pall. ex Lehm.; Myosotis vestita Velen.

= Myosotis stricta =

Species of flowering plant

Myosotis stricta is a plant species of the genus Myosotis. Common names include strict forget-me-not and blue scorpion grass.
