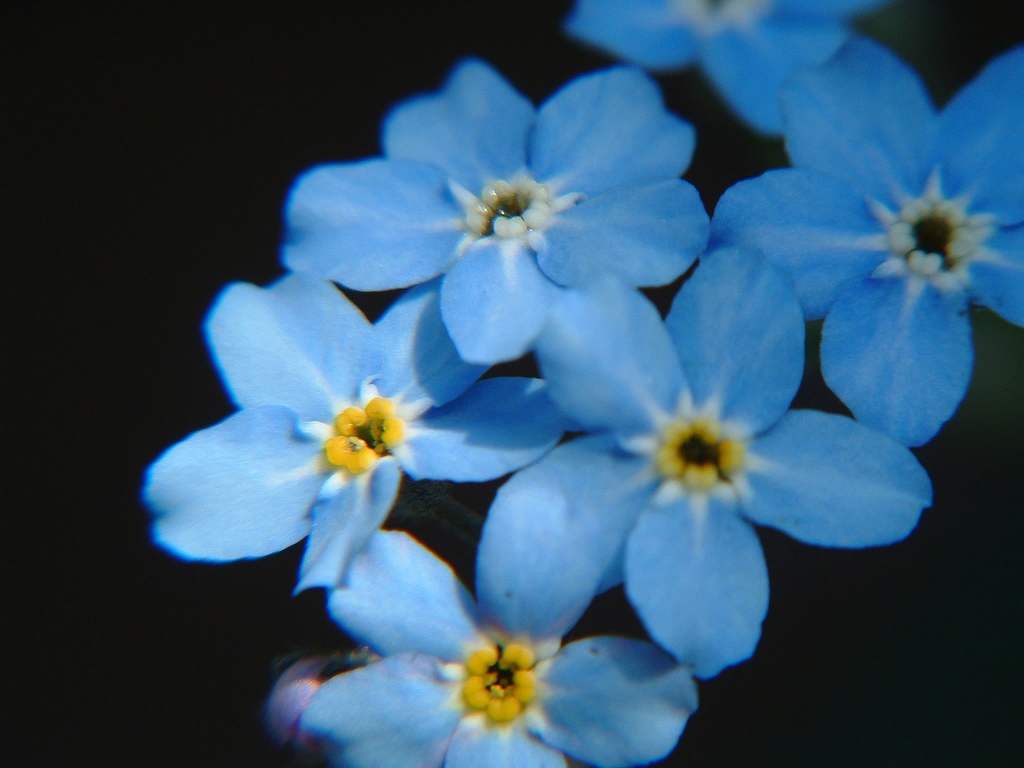

Scientific classification
- Kingdom: Plantae
- Clade: Tracheophytes
- Clade: Angiosperms
- Clade: Eudicots
- Clade: Asterids
- Order: Boraginales
- Family: Boraginaceae
- Genus: Myosotis
- Species: M. latifolia

Binomial name
- Myosotis latifolia Poir.

Synonyms
- Myosotis oblongata Link

= Myosotis latifolia =

Species of flowering plant

Myosotis latifolia is a species of forget-me-not known by the common name broadleaf forget-me-not. It is native to the Canary Islands, and it is known elsewhere as an introduced species, including the west coast of the United States. It grows in many types of habitat, including moist, shaded, disturbed areas. It is a perennial herb sometimes exceeding half a meter in height. The leaves are generally oval in shape, the largest at the woody base of the stem. The inflorescence is a coiled or curved array of tiny hairy flowers at the top of the stem. The tubular flower has a flat pink or blue face up to a centimeter wide.
