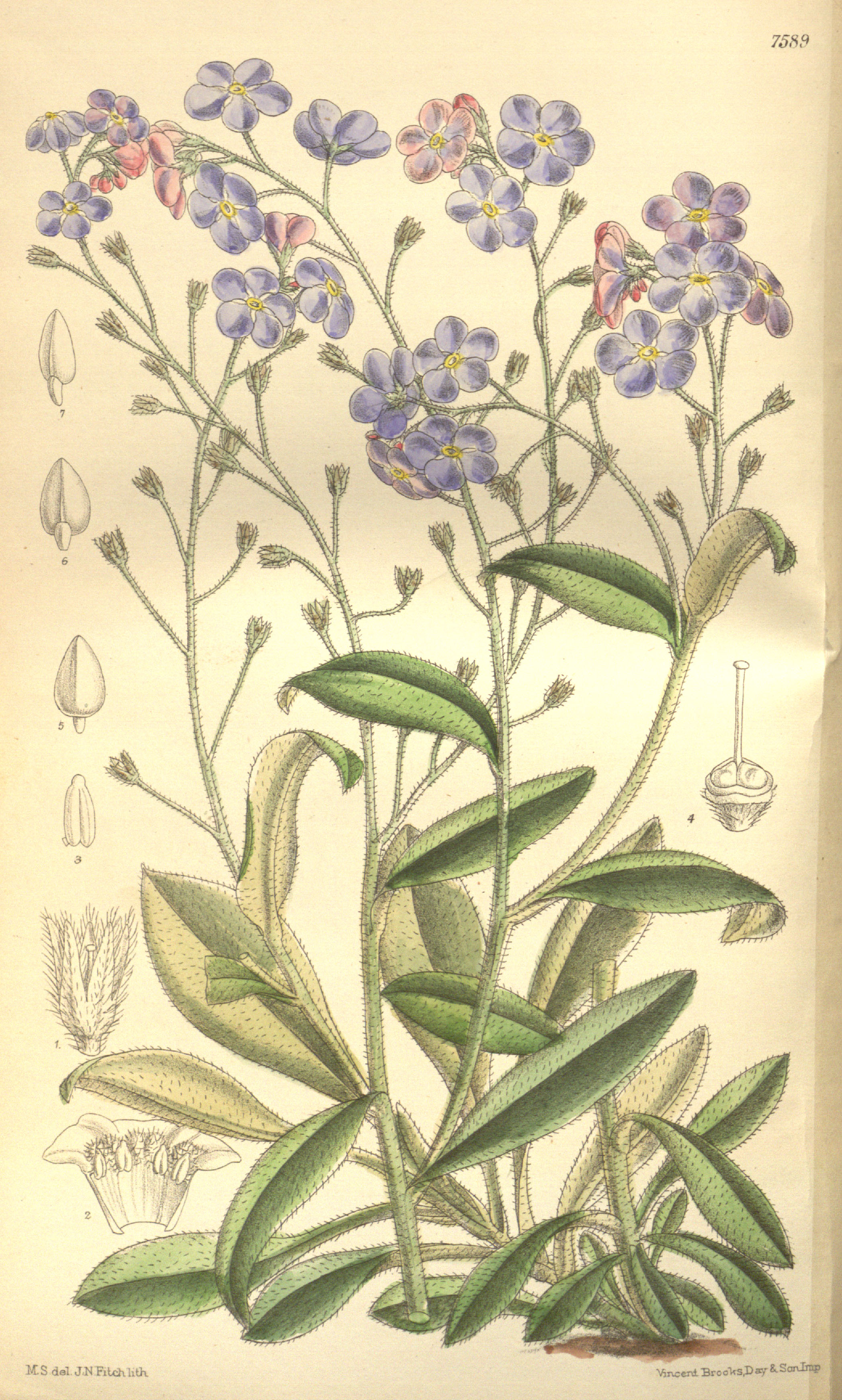

Scientific classification
- Kingdom: Plantae
- Clade: Tracheophytes
- Clade: Angiosperms
- Clade: Eudicots
- Clade: Asterids
- Order: Boraginales
- Family: Boraginaceae
- Genus: Myosotis
- Species: M. dissitiflora

Binomial name
- Myosotis dissitiflora Baker

Synonyms
- Myosotis amoena (Rupr.) Boiss.; Myosotis caucasica Domin; Myosotis dissitiflora var. dyerae E.J.Lowe ex Hook.f.; Myosotis dyerae (E.J.Lowe ex Hook.f.) P.D.Sell; Strophiostoma amoena Rupr.

= Myosotis dissitiflora =

Species of flowering plant

Myosotis dissitiflora is a species of forget-me-not native to the Caucasus. It is one of the largest-flowered species in Myosotis. There used to be a dozen of ornamental cultivars during the late 19th and early 20th centuries, but they are all lost now. Currently there exist two known cultivars, namely 'Baby Blue' and 'Myomark'.
