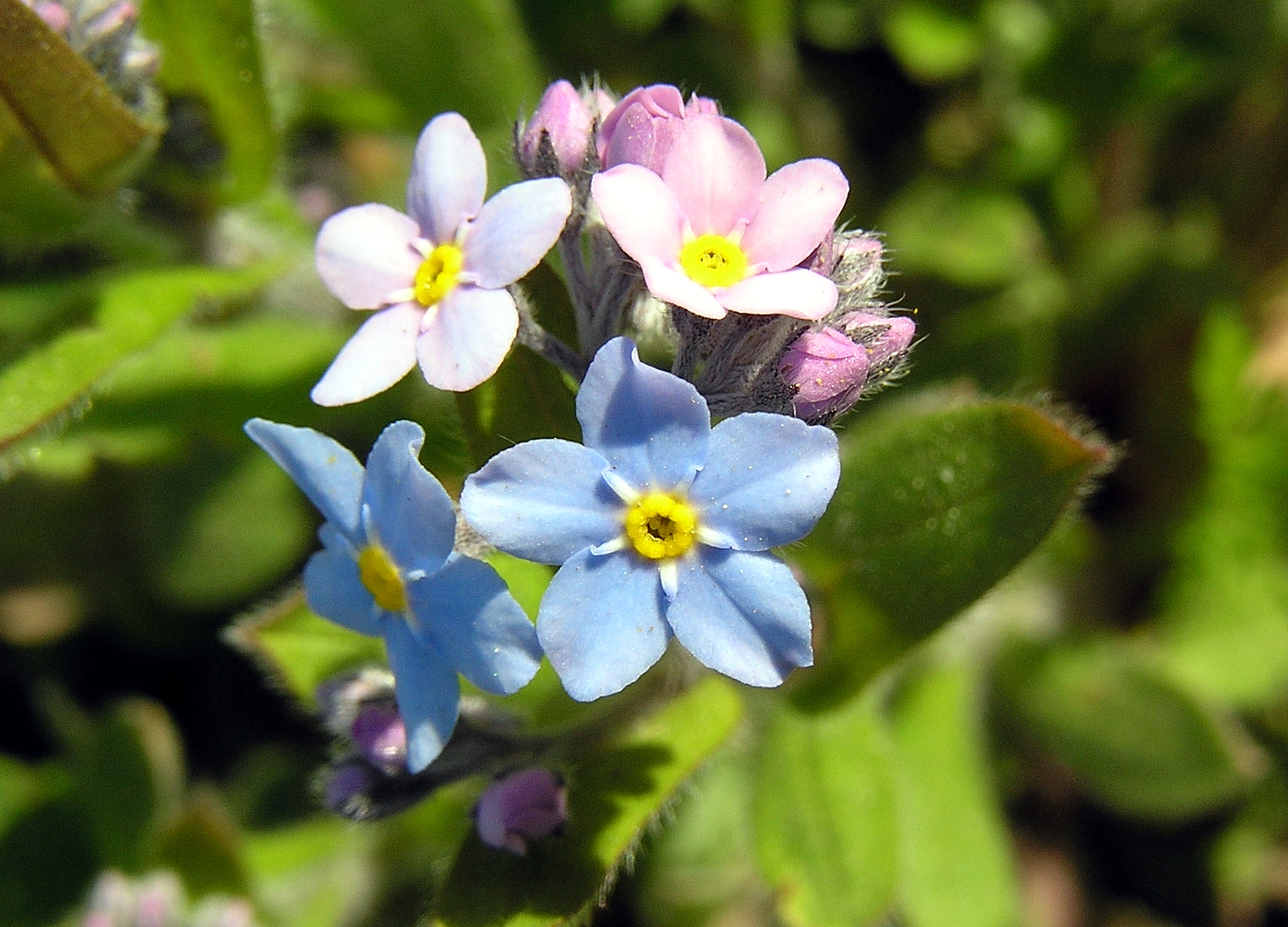
- Myosotis arvensis

Scientific classification
- Kingdom: Plantae
- Clade: Tracheophytes
- Clade: Angiosperms
- Clade: Eudicots
- Clade: Asterids
- Order: Boraginales
- Family: Boraginaceae
- Subfamily: Boraginoideae
- Genus: Myosotis; L. (1753)

Type species
- Myosotis scorpioides L.

Synonyms
- Echioides Moench (1794), nom. illeg.; Exarrhena R.Br. (1810); Gymnomyosotis (A.DC.) O.D.Nikif. (2000); Scorpioides Gilib. (1782), not validly publ.; Scorpiurus Haller (1768), nom. superfl.; Strophiostoma Turcz. (1840)

= Myosotis =

Genus of flowering plants

Myosotis (/ˌmaɪ.ə.ˈsoʊ.tɪs/, MY-ə-SOH-tiss) is a genus of flowering plants in the borage family Boraginaceae. In the Northern Hemisphere, they are colloquially known as forget-me-nots or scorpion grasses. The forget-me-not is the official flower of Alaska.

The name comes from the Ancient Greek μυοσωτίς (myosōtis) "mouse's ear", which the foliage is thought to resemble. The genus is not to be confused with the related Chatham Islands species Myosotidium hortensia.

== Description ==
The genus was originally described by Carl Linnaeus. The type species is Myosotis scorpioides. Myosotis species are annual or perennial, herbaceous, flowering plants with pentamerous actinomorphic flowers.

Their foliage is alternate, and their roots are generally diffuse. They typically flower in spring or soon after the melting of snow in alpine ecosystems.

Flowers are borne on scorpioid cymes; they are flatly faced, with a typical diameter of 1 cm (1/2 in) or less; they are coloured typically blue, but sometimes pink, white or yellow. Its centre consists of five anthers each on filaments fused to the petals, they are surrounded by yellow bumps called "fornices".

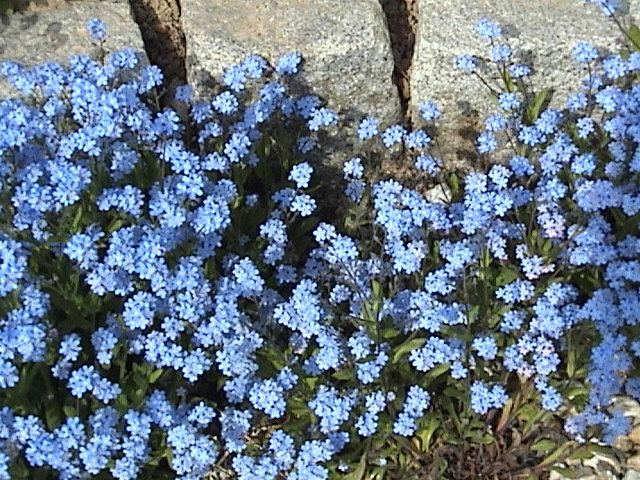
Myosotis sylvatica

The seeds are contained in small, tulip-shaped pods along the stem to the flower. The pods attach to clothing when brushed against and eventually fall off, leaving the small seed within the pod to germinate elsewhere. Seeds can be collected by placing a sheet of paper under stems and shaking the seed pods onto the paper.

Myosotis scorpioides is colloquially called scorpion grass because of the spiraling curvature of its inflorescence.

== Distribution ==
The genus is largely restricted to western Eurasia, with over 60 confirmed species, and New Zealand with around 40 endemic species. A few species occur elsewhere, including North America, South America, and Papua New Guinea. Despite this, Myosotis species are now common throughout temperate latitudes because of the introduction of cultivars and alien species. Many are popular in horticulture. They prefer moist habitats. In locales where they are not native, they frequently escape to wetlands and riverbanks.

One or two European species, especially Myosotis sylvatica, the "woodland" forget-me-not, have been introduced into most of the temperate regions of Europe, Asia, and the Americas.

Genetic analysis indicates that the genus originated in the Northern Hemisphere, and that species native to New Zealand, Australia, New Guinea, and South America form a lineage of closely related species that are likely derived from a single dispersal event to the Southern Hemisphere.

== Ecology ==
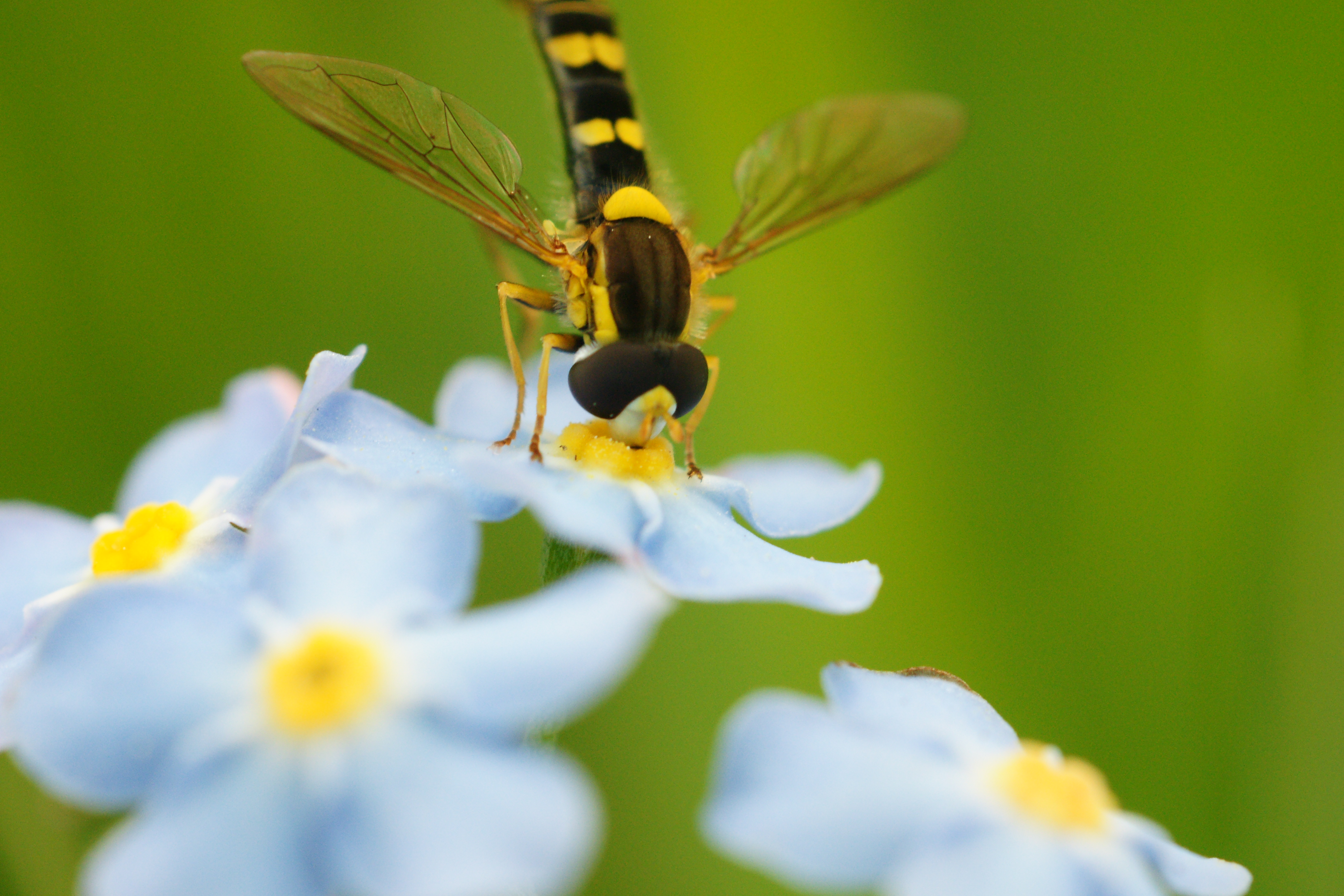
Hover fly (Sphaerophoria scripta) feeding on a Myosotis flower

Myosotis species are food for the larvae of some Lepidoptera species, including the setaceous Hebrew character. Many of the species in New Zealand are threatened.

== Taxonomy ==
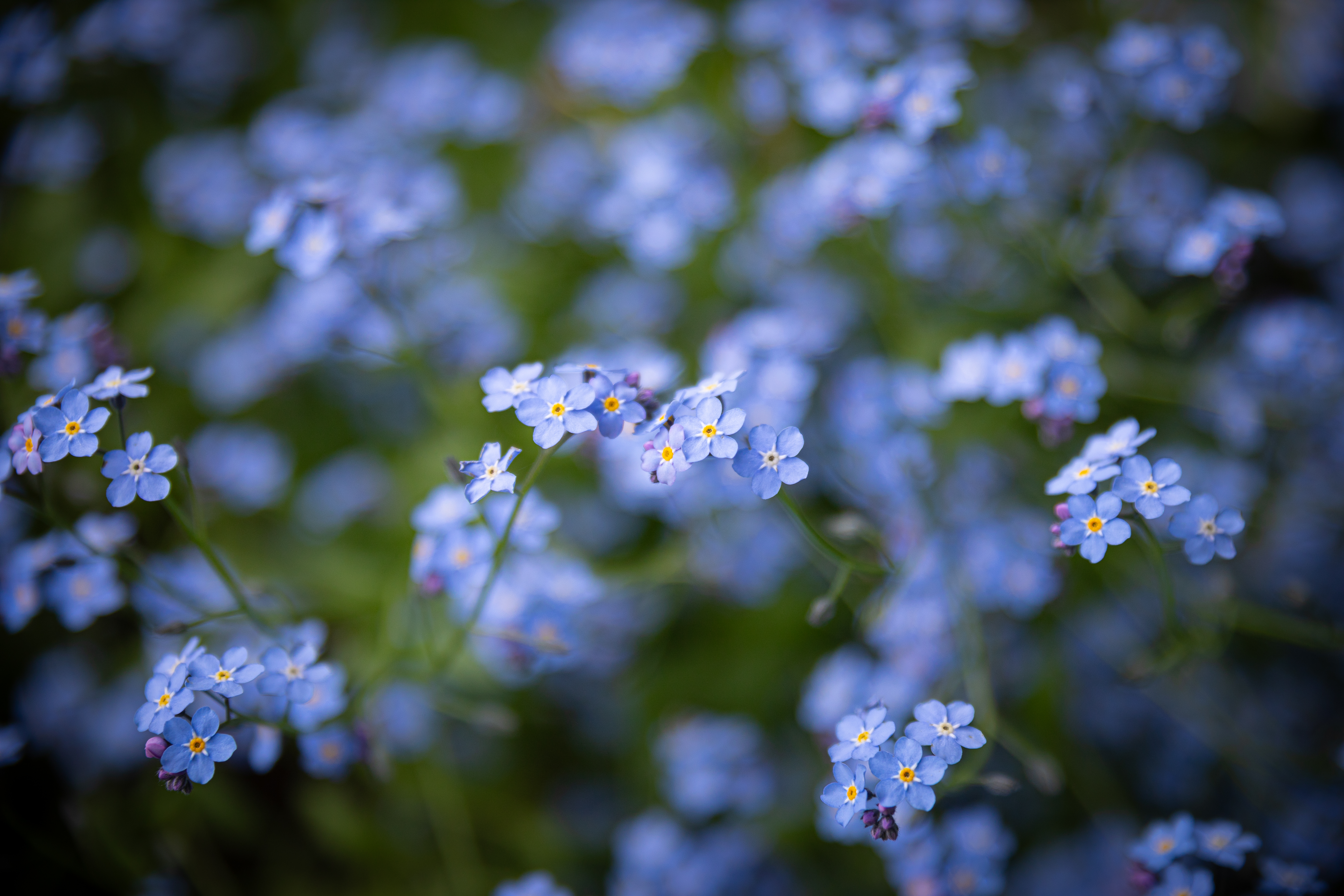
Woodland forget-me-not (Myosotis sylvatica)

Of more than 510 recorded species names, only 156 species are presently accepted, listed below. The remainder are either synonyms or hybrids of presently accepted or proposed names.

- Myosotis abyssinica Boiss. & Reut.
- Myosotis afropalustris C.H. Wright
- Myosotis albicans Riedl
- Myosotis albiflora Banks & Sol. ex Hook.f.
- Myosotis albosericea Hook.f.
- Myosotis alpestris F.W.Schmidt (alpine forget-me-not)
- Myosotis amabilis Cheeseman
- Myosotis ambigens (Bég.) Grau
- Myosotis angustata Cheeseman
- Myosotis anomala Riedl
- Myosotis antarctica Hook.f.
- Myosotis arnoldii L.B.Moore
- Myosotis arvensis (L.) Hill (field forget-me-not)
- Myosotis asiatica (Vestergr. ex Hultén) Schischk. & Serg. (Asiatic forget-me-not)
- Myosotis atlantica Vestergr.
- Myosotis australis R.Br.
- Myosotis austrosibirica O.D.Nikif.
- Myosotis azorica H.C.Watson (Azores forget-me-not)
- Myosotis baicalensis O.D.Nikif.
- Myosotis balbisiana Jord.
- Myosotis × bohemica Domin
- Myosotis × bollandica P.Jeps.
- Myosotis bothriospermoides Kitag.
- Myosotis brachypoda Gren.
- Myosotis brevis de Lange & Barkla
- Myosotis brockiei L.B.Moore & M.J.A.Simpson
- Myosotis bryonoma Meudt, Prebble & Thorsen
- Myosotis butorinae Stepanov
- Myosotis × cadevallii Sennen
- Myosotis cadmea Kitag
- Myosotis cameroonensis Cheek & R.Becker
- Myosotis capitata Hook.f.
- Myosotis chaffeyorum Lehnebach
- Myosotis chakassica O.D.Nikif.
- Myosotis cheesemanii Petrie
- Myosotis × cinerascens Petrie
- Myosotis colensoi (Kirk) J.F.Macbr.
- Myosotis concinna Cheeseman
- Myosotis congesta Shuttlew.
- Myosotis corsicana (Fiori) Grau
- Myosotis czekanowskii (Trautv.) Kamelin & V.N.Tikhom.
- Myosotis daralaghezica T.N.Popova
- Myosotis debilis Pomel
- Myosotis decumbens Host
- Myosotis densiflora K.Koch
- Myosotis diminuta Grau
- Myosotis discolor Pers. (changing forget-me-not)
- Myosotis densiflora C. Koch
- Myosotis dissitiflora Baker
- Myosotis dubia Arrond.
- Myosotis ergakensis Stepanov
- Myosotis exarrhena F. Muell.
- Myosotis eximia Petrie
- Myosotis explanata Cheeseman
- Myosotis forsteri Lehm.
- Myosotis gallica Vestergr.
- Myosotis galpinii C.H.Wright
- Myosotis glabrescens L.B.Moore
- Myosotis glauca (G.Simpson & J.S.Thomson) de Lange & Barkla
- Myosotis goyenii Petrie
- Myosotis graminifolia DC.
- Myosotis graui Selvi
- Myosotis guneri A.P.Khokhr.
- Myosotis heteropoda Trautv.
- Myosotis hikuwai Meudt, Prebble & G.M.Rogers
- Myosotis imitata Serg.
- Myosotis incrassata Guss.
- Myosotis jenissejensis O.D.Nikif.
- Myosotis jordanovii N.Andreev & Peev
- Myosotis × kablikiana Domin
- Myosotis kamelinii O.D.Nikif.
- Myosotis kazakhstanica O.D.Nikif.
- Myosotis kebeshensis Stepanov
- Myosotis keniensis T.C.E.Fr.
- Myosotis koelzii Riedl
- Myosotis kolakovskyi A.P.Khokhr.
- Myosotis × krajinae Domin
- Myosotis krasnoborovii O.D.Nikif. & Lomon.
- Myosotis krylovii Serg.
- Myosotis kurdica Riedl
- Myosotis laeta Cheeseman
- Myosotis laingii Cheeseman
- Myosotis latifolia Poir. (broadleaf forget-me-not)
- Myosotis laxa Lehm. (tufted forget-me-not or bay forget-me-not)
- Myosotis lazica Popov
- Myosotis lithospermifolia Hornem.
- Myosotis lithuanica (Schmalh.) Besser ex Dobrocz.
- Myosotis litoralis Steven ex M.Bieb.
- Myosotis ludomilae Zaver.
- Myosotis lyallii Hook.f.
- Myosotis macrantha (Hook.f.) Benth. & Hook.f. (bronze forget-me-not)
- Myosotis macrosiphon Font Quer & Maire
- Myosotis macrosperma Engelm. (largeseed forget-me-not)
- Myosotis magniflora A.P.Khokhr.
- Myosotis margaritae Štěpánková
- Myosotis maritima Hochst. ex Seub.
- Myosotis martini Sennen
- Myosotis matthewsii L.B.Moore
- Myosotis michaelae Štěpánková
- Myosotis micrantha Pall. ex Lehm.
- Myosotis minutiflora Boiss. & Reut.
- Myosotis monroi Cheeseman (Monro's forget-me-not)
- Myosotis nemorosa Besser
- Myosotis nikiforovae Stepanov
- Myosotis ochotensis O.D.Nikif.
- Myosotis olympica Boiss.
- Myosotis oreophila Petrie
- Myosotis pansa (L.B.Moore) Meudt, Prebble, R.J.Stanley & Thorsen
- Myosotis × parviflora (Schur) Domin
- Myosotis paucipilosa (Grau) Ristow & Hand
- Myosotis × permixta Domin
- Myosotis persoonii Georges RouyRouy & E.G.Camus
- Myosotis petiolata Hook.f.
- Myosotis platyphylla Boiss.
- Myosotis popovii Dobrocz.
- Myosotis pospelovae O.D.Nikif.
- Myosotis pottsiana (L.B.Moore) Meudt, Prebble, R.J.Stanley & Thorsen
- Myosotis propinqua (Turcz.) Fisch. & C.A.Mey.
- Myosotis × pseudohispida Domin
- Myosotis pulvinaris Hook.f. (cushion forget-me-not)
- Myosotis pusilla Loisel.
- Myosotis radix-palaris A.P.Khokhr.
- Myosotis rakiura L.B.Moore
- Myosotis ramosissima Rochel (early forget-me-not)
- Myosotis refracta Boiss.
- Myosotis rehsteineri (Hausm.) Wartm. ex Reut.
- Myosotis retrorsa Meudt, Prebble & Hindmarsh-Walls
- Myosotis rivularis (Vestergr.) A.P. Khokhr
- Myosotis robusta D.Don
- Myosotis sajanensis O.D.Nikif.
- Myosotis saxatilis Petrie
- Myosotis saxosa Hook.f.
- Myosotis schistosa A.P.Khokhr.
- Myosotis schmakovii O.D.Nikif.
- Myosotis scorpioides (L.) (true forget-me-not)
- Myosotis secunda Al.Murray (creeping forget-me-not)
- Myosotis semiamplexicaulis DC.
- Myosotis sicula Guss. (Jersey forget-me-not)
- Myosotis solange Greuter & Zaffran
- Myosotis soleirolii Godr.
- Myosotis sparsiflora J.C.Mikan ex Pohl
- Myosotis spatulata G.Forst.
- Myosotis speciosa Pomel
- Myosotis speluncicola Schott ex Boiss.
- Myosotis stenophylla Knaf
- Myosotis stolonifera (J.Gay ex DC.) J.Gay ex Leresche & Levier
- Myosotis stricta Link ex Roem. & Schult.
- Myosotis suavis Petrie]
- Myosotis subcordata Riedl
- Myosotis × suzae Domin
- Myosotis sylvatica Ehrh. ex Hoffm. (wood forget-me-not)
- Myosotis taverae Valdés
- Myosotis tenericaulis Petrie
- Myosotis tineoi C.Brullo & Brullo
- Myosotis traversii Hook.f.
- Myosotis tuxeniana (O.Bolòs & Vigo) O.Bolòs & Vigo
- Myosotis ucrainica Czern.
- Myosotis ultramafica Meudt, Prebble & Rance
- Myosotis umbrosa Meudt, Prebble & Thorsen
- Myosotis uniflora Hook.f.
- Myosotis urceolaris Shuttlew.
- Myosotis venosa Colenso
- Myosotis venticola Meudt & Prebble
- Myosotis verchojanica O.D.Nikif.
- Myosotis verna Nutt. (spring forget-me-not)
- Myosotis vestergrenii Stroh
- Myosotis welwitschii Boiss. & Reut.
- Myosotis wumengensis L.Wei

== Gallery ==
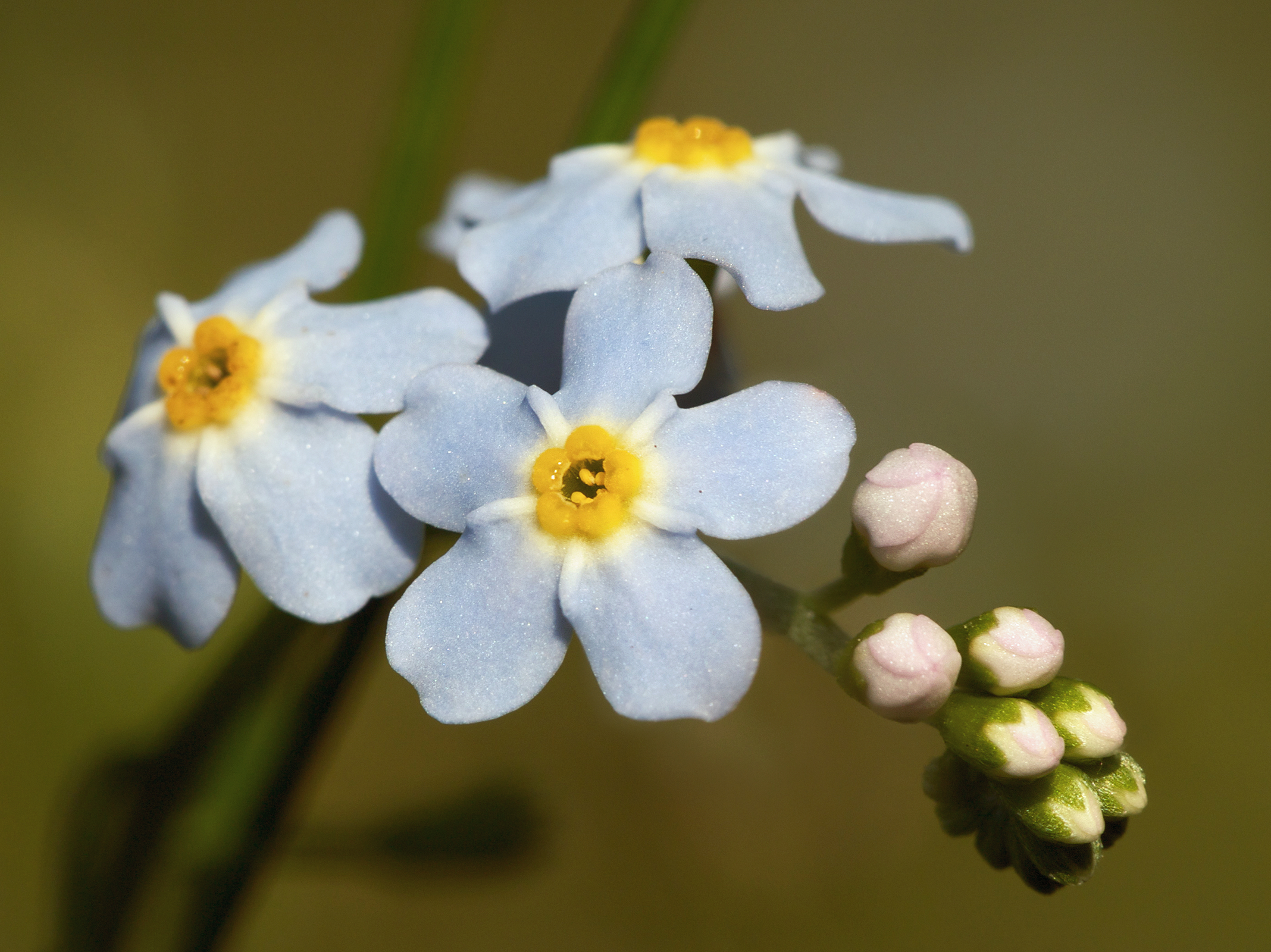
Myosotis scorpioides

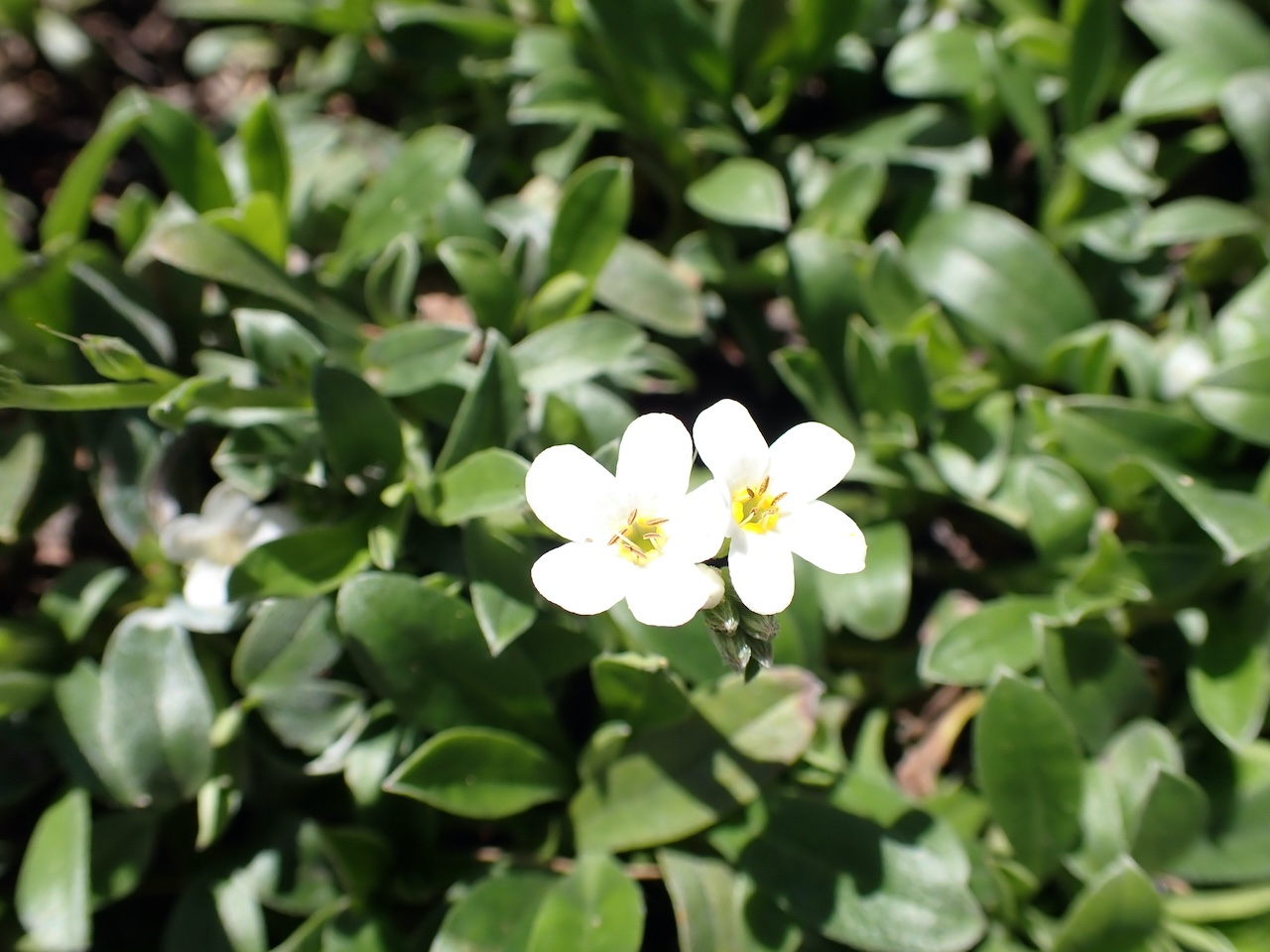
Myosotis eximia

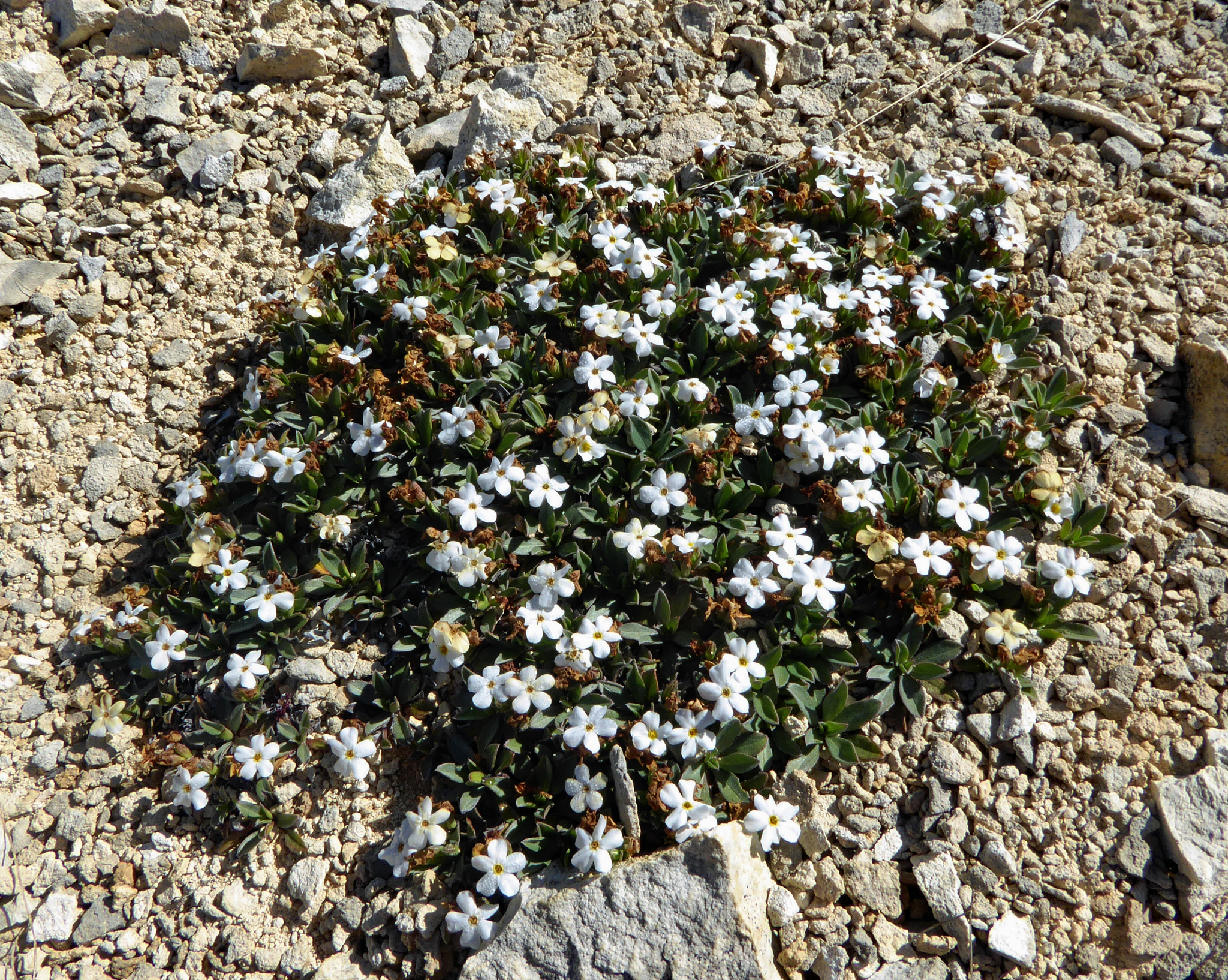
Myosotis colensoi

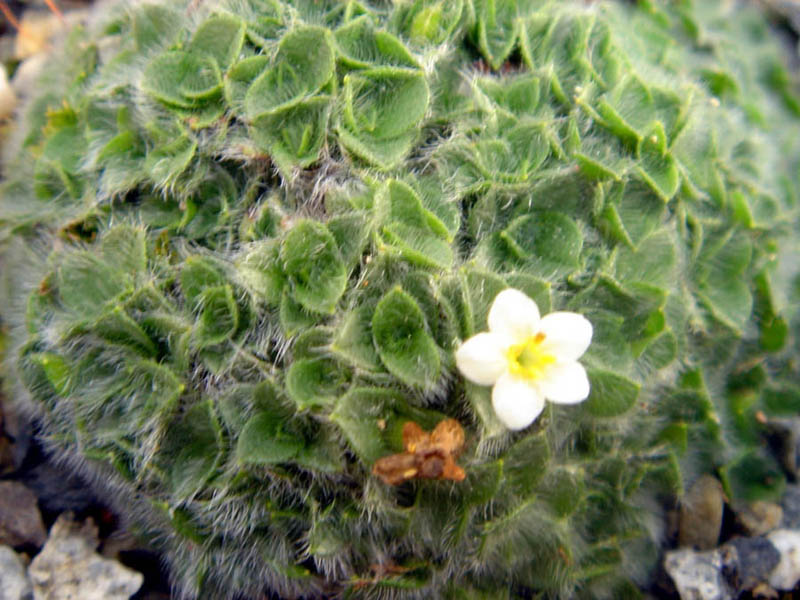
Myosotis pulvinaris

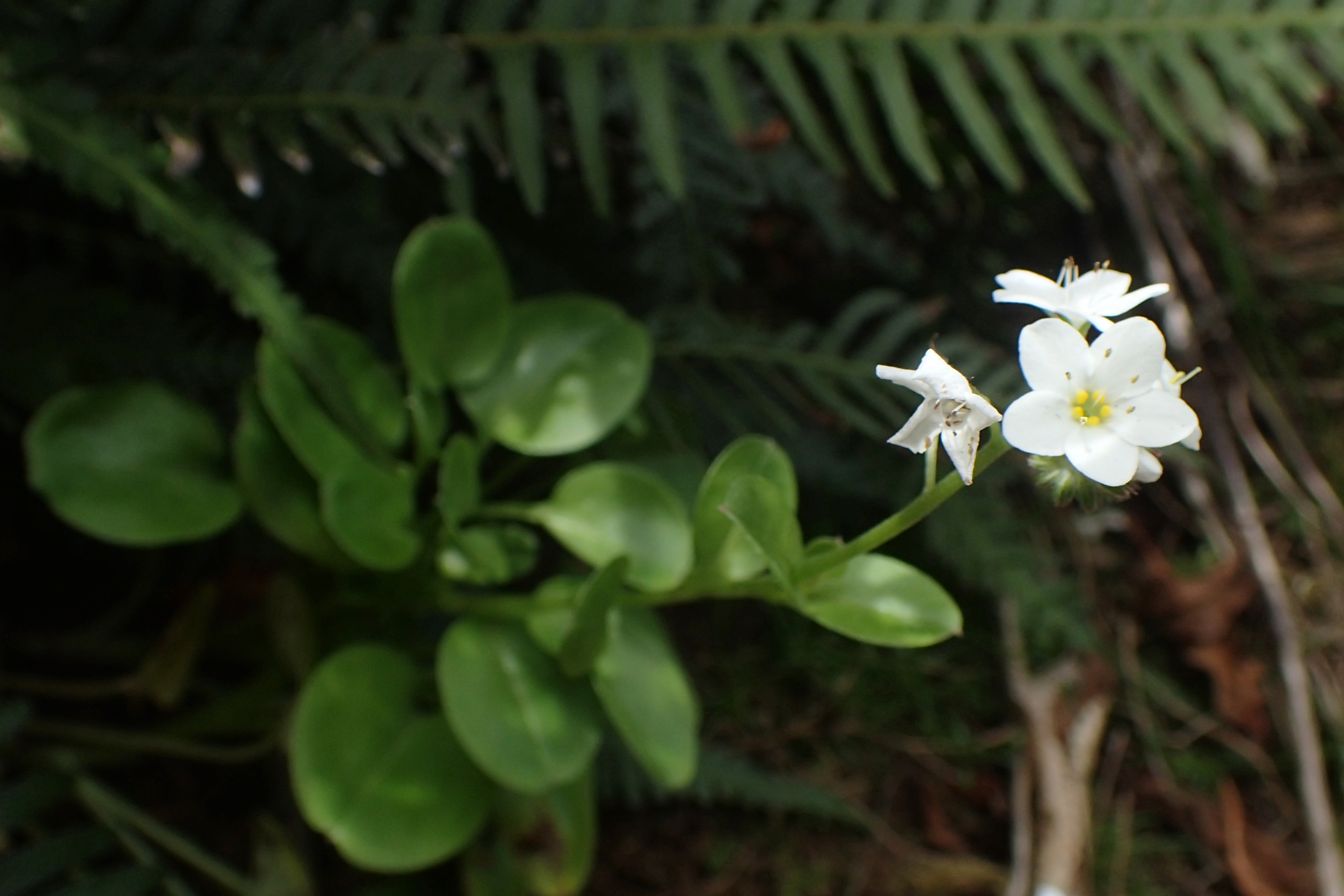
Myosotis pansa

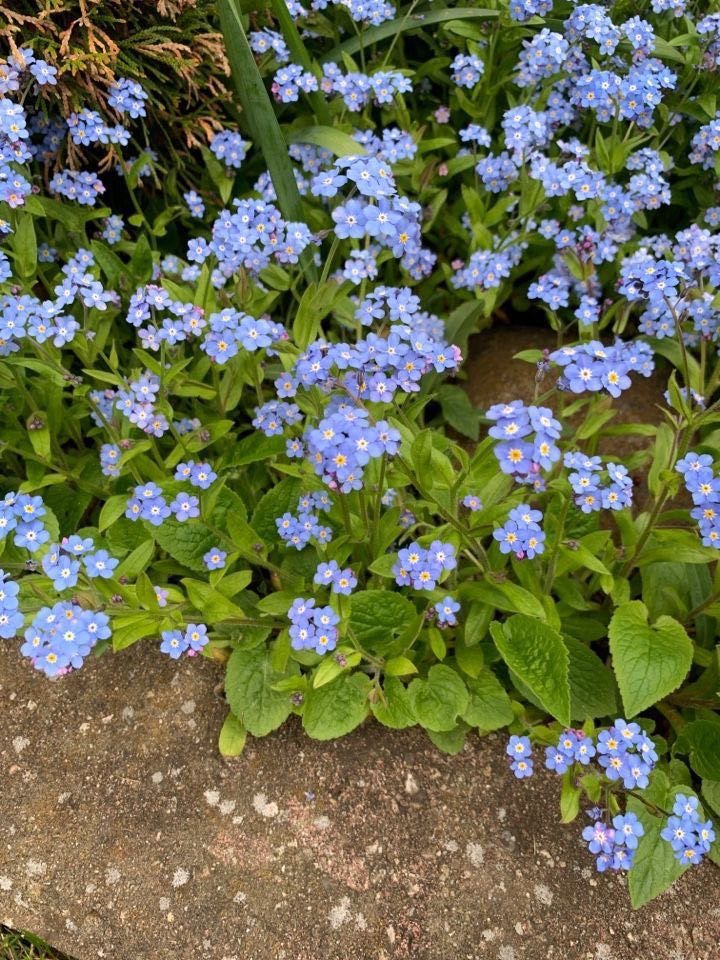
Myosotis sylvatica

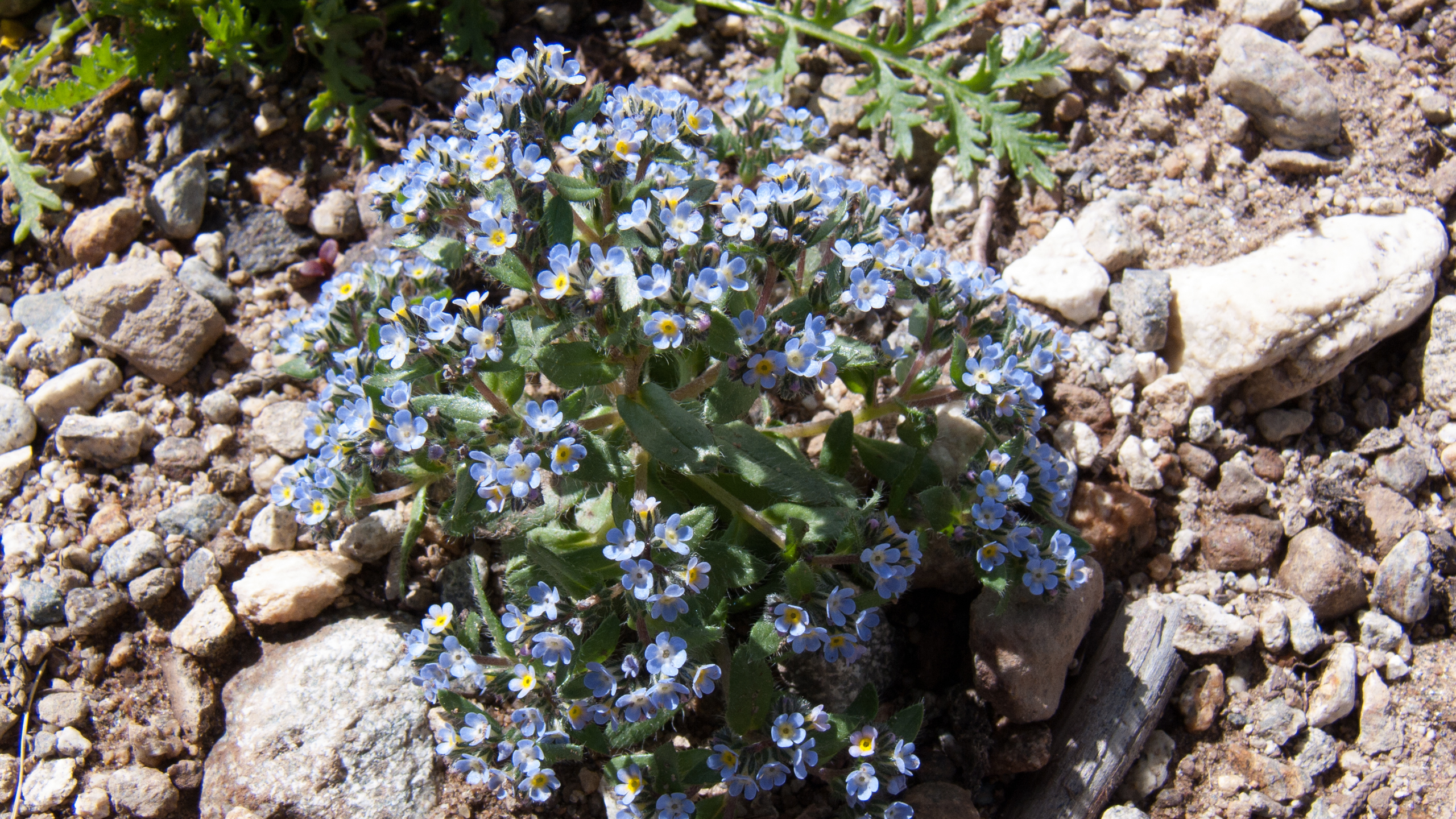
Myosotis alpestris

== Symbolism ==
The small, blue forget-me-not flower was first used by the Grand Lodge Zur Sonne, in 1926, as a Masonic emblem at the annual convention in Bremen, Germany. In 1938, a forget-me-not badge—made by the same factory as the Masonic badge—was chosen for the annual Nazi Party Winterhilfswerk, the annual charity drive of the National Socialist People's Welfare, the welfare branch of the Nazi party. This coincidence enabled Freemasons to wear the forget-me-not badge as a secret sign of membership.

After World War II, the forget-me-not flower was used again as a Masonic emblem in 1948 at the first Annual Convention of the United Grand Lodges of Germany. The badge is now worn in the coat lapel by Freemasons around the world to remember all who suffered in the name of Freemasonry, especially those during the Nazi era.

The flower is also used as a symbol of remembrance by the people of Newfoundland and Labrador. It is used to commemorate those from the Dominion who were killed in the Battle of Beaumont-Hamel, and more largely the First World War. It is typically worn around July 1 and November 11.

It is also used in Germany to commemorate the fallen soldiers of the world wars in a similar manner to the use of remembrance poppies in the UK.

The flower is also the symbol for the Armenian genocide's 100th anniversary. The design of the flower is a black dot symbolising the past, and the suffering of Armenian people. The light purple appendages symbolise the present, and unity of Armenians. The five purple petals symbolise the future, and the five continents to which Armenians escaped. The yellow in the centre symbolises eternity, and the Tsitsernakaberd itself symbolises the 12 provinces lost to Turkey.

In Lithuania, the flower has become one of the symbols for the commemoration of the January events of 1991.

In the Netherlands, the forget-me-not has become a symbol for Alzheimer Nederland, a foundation advocating for people suffering from dementia.

In New Zealand, the forget-me-not is the symbol for Alzheimers New Zealand, the foundation advocating for people suffering from Alzheimer's disease and dementia.

In the United Kingdom, many health settings make use of the forget-me-not as a symbol to highlight that someone has dementia; it may be placed on notes, bedsides or patient boards. Also in the United Kingdom, the forget-me-not is the symbol of the Alzheimer's Society.

In the history of art, the forget-me-not is used to remember loved ones who have died, and so is very common in funerary portraits.

Since the Medieval period it has become a symbol of everlasting love and devotion. There is a German legend set as an origin story behind the name "Forget-Me-Not". In the legend, a knight was walking with his lady near the Danube River and decided to pick blue flowers for her. While picking the flowers he fell in the river and was swept away. He tossed the flowers to his lady and his last words to her were "Forget-me-not!".
