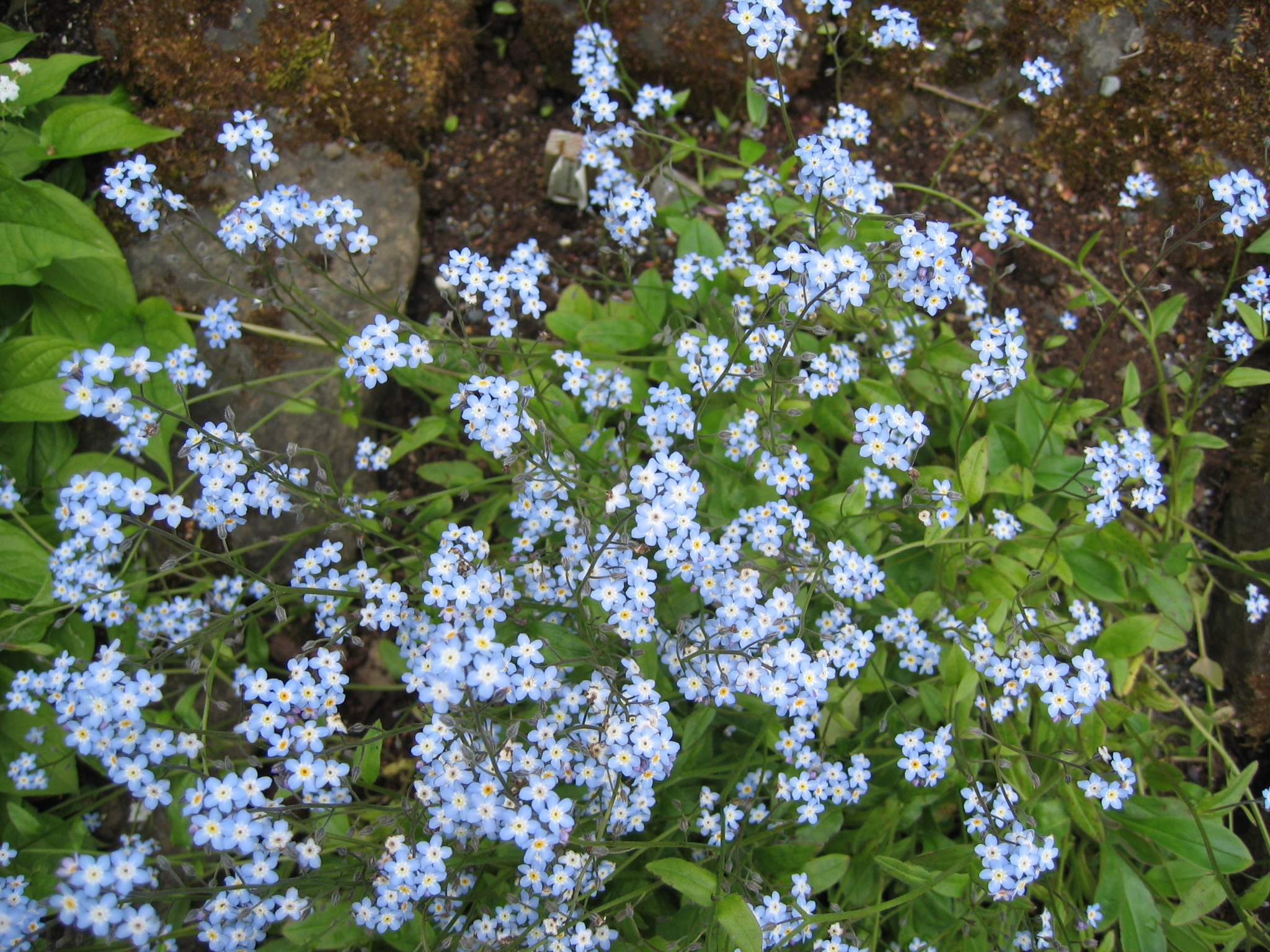

Scientific classification
- Kingdom: Plantae
- Clade: Tracheophytes
- Clade: Angiosperms
- Clade: Eudicots
- Clade: Asterids
- Order: Boraginales
- Family: Boraginaceae
- Genus: Myosotis
- Species: M. decumbens

Binomial name
- Myosotis decumbens Host

Synonyms
- Myosotis frigida (Vestergr.) Czernov

= Myosotis decumbens =

Species of flowering plant

Myosotis decumbens is a plant species in the family Boraginaceae. There are 6 infraspecific names recognized:

- Myosotis decumbens subsp. decumbens
- Myosotis decumbens subsp. florentina Grau
- Myosotis decumbens subsp. kerneri (Dalla Torre & Sarnth.) Grau
- Myosotis decumbens subsp. rifana (Maire) Greuter & Burdet
- Myosotis decumbens subsp. teresiana (Sennen) Grau
- Myosotis decumbens subsp. variabilis (P.Angelis) Grau
