= Myosotis afropalustris =

Scientific classification
- Kingdom: Plantae
- Clade: Tracheophytes
- Clade: Angiosperms
- Clade: Eudicots
- Clade: Asterids
- Order: Boraginales
- Family: Boraginaceae
- Genus: Myosotis
- Species: M. afropalustris

Binomial name
- Myosotis afropalustris Boiss. & Reut.

Species of plant

Myosotis afropalustris

Myosotis afropalustris (/ˌmaɪ.əˈsoʊtɪs/) is a species of plant in the family of Boraginaceae. They can be found in South Africa (Free State, KwaZulu-Natal, E-Cape Prov.), and Lesotho. M. afropalustris is not endemic to South Africa.
