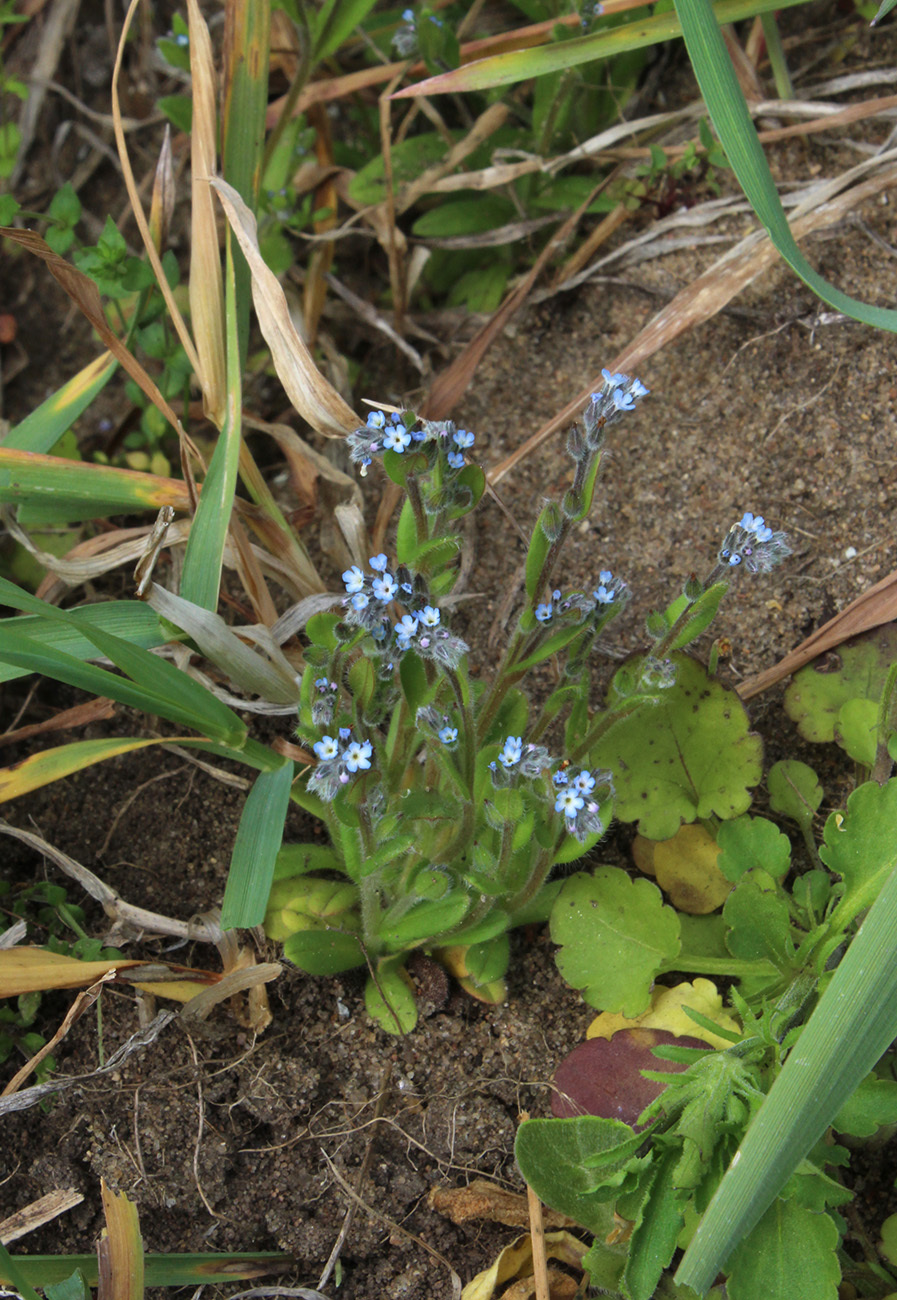

Scientific classification
- Kingdom: Plantae
- Clade: Tracheophytes
- Clade: Angiosperms
- Clade: Eudicots
- Clade: Asterids
- Order: Boraginales
- Family: Boraginaceae
- Genus: Myosotis
- Species: M. micrantha

Binomial name
- Myosotis micrantha Pall. ex Lehm.

= Myosotis micrantha =

Species of flowering plant

Myosotis micrantha is a species of flowering plant belonging to the family Boraginaceae.

Its native range is Caucasus to Central Asia.
