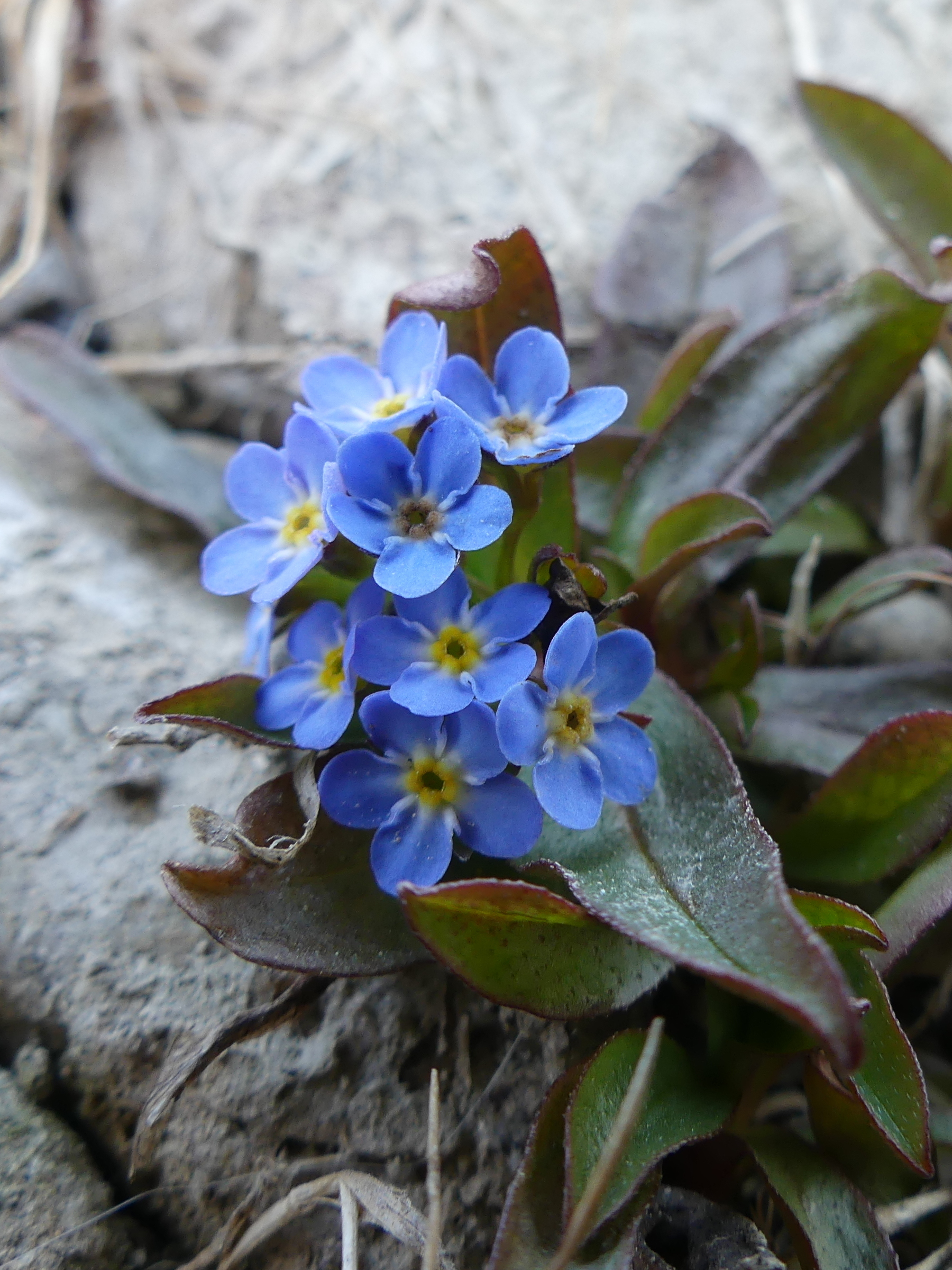

Scientific classification
- Kingdom: Plantae
- Clade: Tracheophytes
- Clade: Angiosperms
- Clade: Eudicots
- Clade: Asterids
- Order: Boraginales
- Family: Boraginaceae
- Genus: Myosotis
- Species: M. rehsteineri

Binomial name
- Myosotis rehsteineri (Hausm.) Wartm. ex Reut.

= Myosotis rehsteineri =

Species of flowering plant

Myosotis rehsteineri is a species of flowering plant belonging to the family Boraginaceae.

Its native range is Alps.
