= Myosotis abyssinica =

Scientific classification
- Kingdom: Plantae
- Clade: Embryophytes
- Clade: Tracheophytes
- Clade: Spermatophytes
- Clade: Angiosperms
- Clade: Eudicots
- Clade: Asterids
- Order: Boraginales
- Family: Boraginaceae
- Genus: Myosotis
- Species: M. abyssinica

Binomial name
- Myosotis abyssinica Boiss. & Reut.

Synonyms
- Myosotis aequinoctialis Baker

Species of flowering plant

Myosotis abyssinica (/ˌmaɪ.əˈsoʊtɪs/) is a species of herbaceous plant in the family Boraginaceae. It can be found in Ethiopia, Sudan, Bioko Island (Fernando Poo), Rwanda, the Democratic Republic of Congo (Zaire), Uganda, Kenya, Tanzania, and Cameroon.

== Description ==
M. abyssinica is an annual herbaceous plant in the forget-me-not family. It reaches a height up of to 30 cm (12 in). Stems are short, with bristly hairs. Leaves are oblong or oblong-lanceolate; flowers are five-petalled, typically white, with a yellow corolla. Seeds are small, black and shiny.
