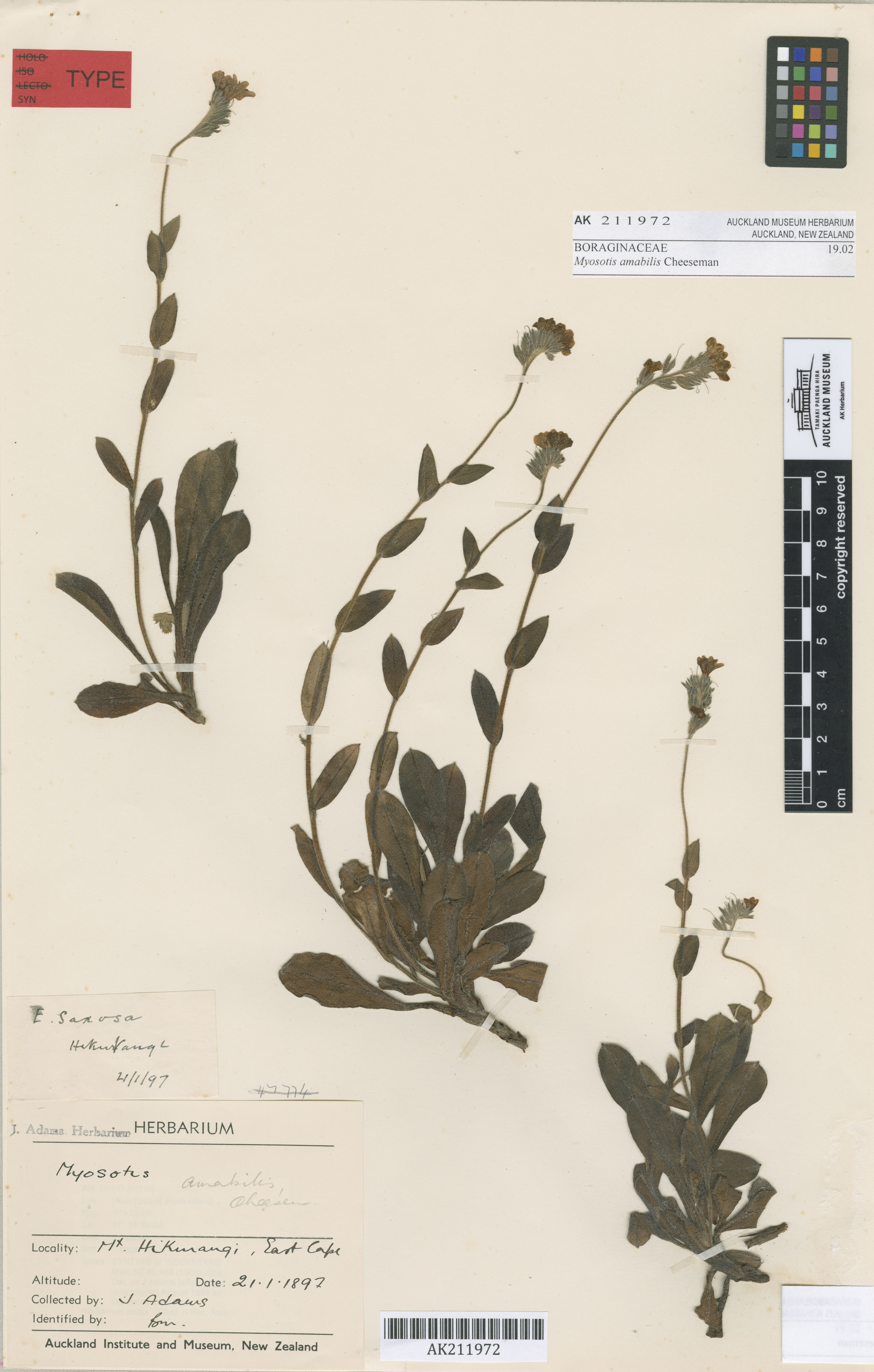
- original material of Myosotis amabilis, specimen AK 211972 collected by James Adams on Hikurangi in 1897

Conservation status
- Nationally Critical (NZ TCS)

Scientific classification
- Kingdom: Plantae
- Clade: Tracheophytes
- Clade: Angiosperms
- Clade: Eudicots
- Clade: Asterids
- Order: Boraginales
- Family: Boraginaceae
- Genus: Myosotis
- Species: M. amabilis

Binomial name
- Myosotis amabilis Cheeseman, 1906

= Myosotis amabilis =

Species of flowering plant

Myosotis amabilis is a species of flowering plant in the family Boraginaceae, endemic to New Zealand. Thomas Cheeseman described the species in 1906 based on specimens collected at Mt Hikurangi. Plants of this species of forget-me-not are perennial rosettes with ebracteate inflorescences and white corollas with stamens that are exserted.

== Taxonomy and etymology ==
Myosotis amabilis Cheeseman is in the plant family Boraginaceae. It was originally described by New Zealand botanist Thomas Cheeseman in his Manual of the New Zealand Flora in 1929. The most recent treatment of this species was done by Lucy B. Moore in the Flora of New Zealand.

The original specimens (syntypes) of this species were collected by Donald Petrie and James Adams on Mt Hikurangi in the North Island, New Zealand. When Adams first collected it there in 1897, he called it M. saxosa. The specimens collected by Adams and Petrie are housed at the herbarium of the Auckland War Memorial Museum (AK).

Cheeseman made the following distinction between M. amabilis and M. saxosa:

"Rather stout, 3–9 in. high. Leaves 1–2½ in., linear-obovate or obovate-spathulate, coriaceous, hispid on both surfaces. Racemes many-flowered. Flowers large, white, ½ in. diam.........17. M. amabilis Small, stout, 2–3 in. high. Leaves ½–¾ |in., oblong-spathulate, hispid and hoary on both surfaces. Racemes few flowered. Flowers small . . . . . . . . 18. M. saxosa."

Some sources consider M. amabilis to be a synonym of M. saxosa, whereas others recognise two distinct species. Whether M. amabilis and M. saxosa are one species or two is an outstanding taxonomic question that requires further study.

== Phylogeny ==
No individuals of M. amabilis have been included in phylogenetic analyses of standard DNA sequencing markers (nuclear ribosomal DNA and chloroplast DNA regions) of New Zealand Myosotis.

== Description ==
Myosotis amabilis plants are rosettes. The rosette leaves have petioles that are about as long as the leaf blades. The rosette leaf blades are about 40 mm long by 15 mm wide (length: width ratio 2.7: 1), usually oblong-spathulate and widest at or above the middle, with an obtuse apex. Both surfaces of the leaf are uniformly and sparsely to densely covered in patent to erect hairs. On the upper surface of the leaf, these hairs are always antrorse (forward-facing) whereas on the lower surface, they are mostly retrorse (backward-facing). Each rosette has several ascending to erect, ebracteate inflorescences that are up to 150 mm long. The cauline leaves are similar to the rosette leaves, but become smaller, are broadly lanceolate and subacute, and have hairs similar to the rosette leaves but less densely distributed and with some retrorse hairs on the underside of the lowest cauline leaves only. The flowers are about 12 per inflorescence, and each is borne on a short pedicel, without a bract. The calyx is about 6 mm long at flowering and fruiting, lobed to one-half tor more of its length, and densely covered in appressed hairs, as well as some patent to erect hooked hairs, all of which are mostly antrorse (with some retrorse or backward-facing hairs near the base). The corolla is white and about 10 mm in diameter, with a cylindrical tube, petals that are rounded-triangular, and small white or yellow scales alternating with the petals. The anthers are exserted, surpassing the faucal scales. The nutlets have not been described.

The pollen of Myosotis amabilis is unknown.

The chromosome number of M. amabilis is unknown.

Flowering and fruiting January–February.

== Distribution and habitat ==
Myosotis amabilis is a forget-me-not originally collected from Mt Hikurangi, East Cape, North Island, New Zealand, and may nr endemic to this area. Very few herbarium specimens of this species have been collected. Some specimens collected in Hawkes Bay (North Island) and even on the South Island have been variously identified as M. amabilis or M. saxosa, and the two species require taxonomic revision. Recent efforts to relocate plants of M. amabilis on Mt Hikurangi and elsewhere have been unsuccessful.

== Conservation status ==
Myosotis amabilis is listed as Threatened – Nationally Critical" with the qualifiers Data Poor (DP), Range Restricted (RR), Sparse (Sp) and Stable (St) on the most recent assessment (2017-2018) under the New Zealand Threatened Classification system for plants.
