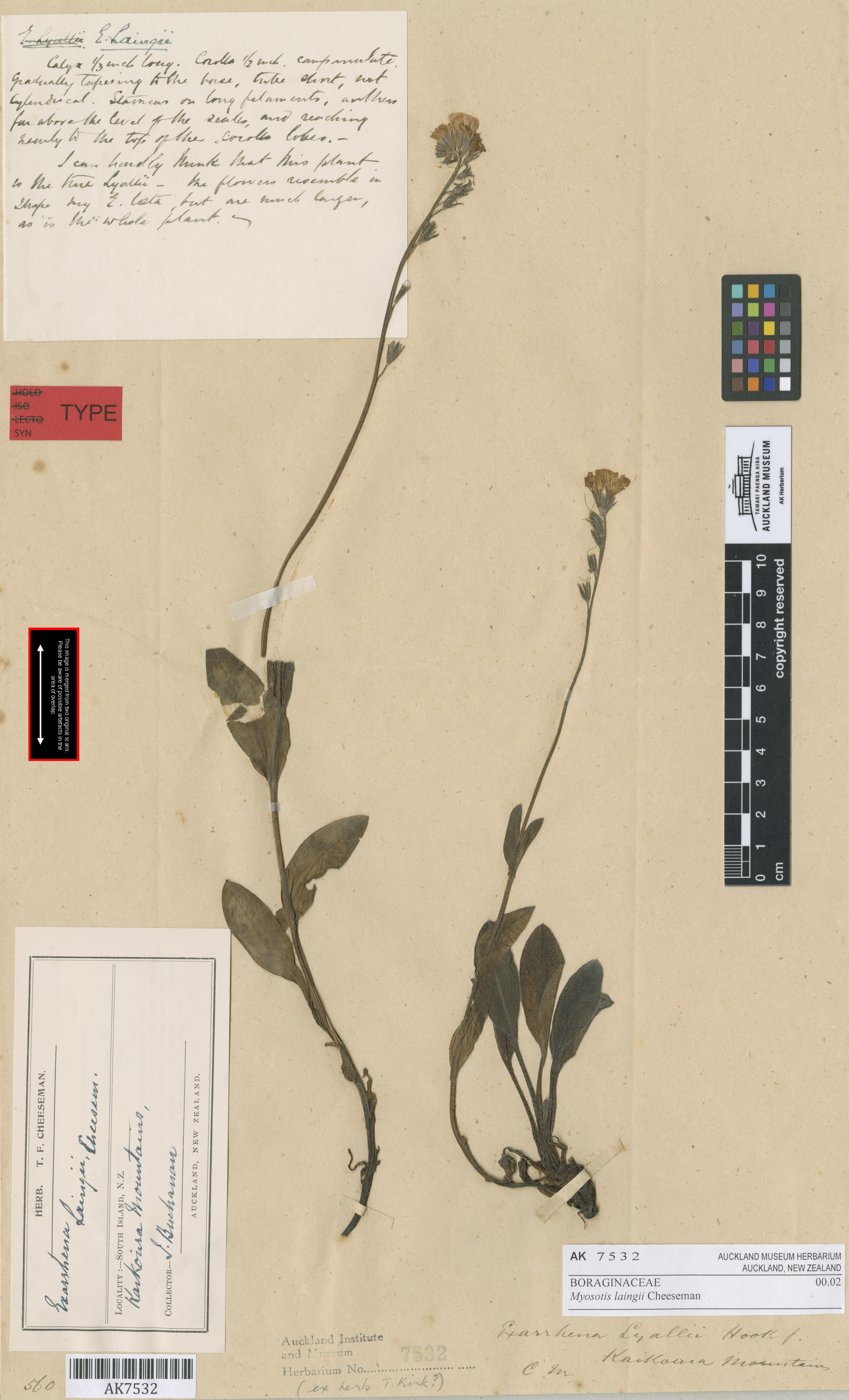
- syntype herbarium specimen of Myosotis laingii AK 7532

Conservation status
- Extinct (NZ TCS)

Scientific classification
- Kingdom: Plantae
- Clade: Tracheophytes
- Clade: Angiosperms
- Clade: Eudicots
- Clade: Asterids
- Order: Boraginales
- Family: Boraginaceae
- Genus: Myosotis
- Species: †M. laingii

Binomial name
- †Myosotis laingii Cheeseman

= Myosotis laingii =

Species of flowering plant

Myosotis laingii is a species of flowering plant in the family Boraginaceae, endemic to the South Island of New Zealand, and considered to be extinct. Thomas Cheeseman described the species in 1912. Plants of this species of forget-me-not are perennial rosettes with ebracteate inflorescences and yellow corollas with stamens that are fully exserted.

== Taxonomy and etymology ==
Myosotis laingii Cheeseman is in the plant family Boraginaceae. The species was originally described in 1912 by Thomas Cheeseman. The most recent treatment of this species was done by Lucy B. Moore in the Flora of New Zealand.

The original specimens (syntypes) of Myosotis laingii were collected by Cheeseman, John Buchanan and Robert Laing in the South Island, New Zealand, some of which are likely lodged the Auckland War Memorial Museum herbarium AK (e.g. AK 7532 and AK 7533).

Myosotis laingii is similar morphologically to another South Island species, M. laeta. Lucy Moore distinguished the two species from each other (and from M. petiolata) in her key using the following characters:

"22 Hairs on undersurface of rosette-leaves retrorse........Myosotis laeta

Hairs on undersurface of rosette-leaves not retrorse.....[23]

23 Leaves spathulate to oblong, very gradually narrowed to petiole; calyx-hairs long, flexuous to slightly hooked, crowded...M. laingii"

Leaves orbicular to broad-elliptic, narrowed abruptly to petiole; calyx-hairs short, stiff, sparse....M. petiolata"

== Phylogeny ==
Myosotis laingii was not included in any of the phylogenetic analyses of standard DNA sequencing markers (nuclear ribosomal DNA and chloroplast DNA regions) of New Zealand Myosotis.

== Description ==
Myosotis laingii plants are rosettes. The rosette leaves have long petioles and are 80–150 mm long by 10–20 mm wide, and the leaf blade is obovate to elliptic-oblong, widest at or above the middle, with an acuminate apex. Both surfaces of the leaf are uniformly and sparsely to densely covered in appressed, antrorse hairs. Each rosette has several erect, ebracteate inflorescences that are up to 400 mm long. The cauline leaves are similar to the rosette leaves, but are smaller, become smaller toward the top of the inflorescence, oblong, and subacute, and have hairs similar to the rosette leaves. The flowers are about 12 per inflorescence, and each is borne on a short pedicel, without a bract. The calyx is 5–6 mm long at flowering and fruiting, lobed to more than one-half of its length, and with densely distributed hairs, some of which are hooked. The corolla is white and 8–10 mm in diameter, with a cylindrical tube, and small scales alternating with the petals. The anthers are fully exserted above the faucal scales. The nutlets were not described.

The pollen of Myosotis laingii is unknown.

The chromosome number of M. laingii is unknown.

Flowering and fruiting for this species is unknown.

== Distribution and habitat ==
Myosotis laingii is a forget-me-not that is known from only a handful of historical specimens. It has been collected in Marlborough, South Island, near Lake Tennyson and in the Kaikōura Mountains from 800–1,400 m (2,600–4,600 ft) above sea level.

== Conservation status ==
Myosotis laingii is listed as Extinct on the most recent assessment (2017–2018) under the New Zealand Threatened Classification system for plants.
