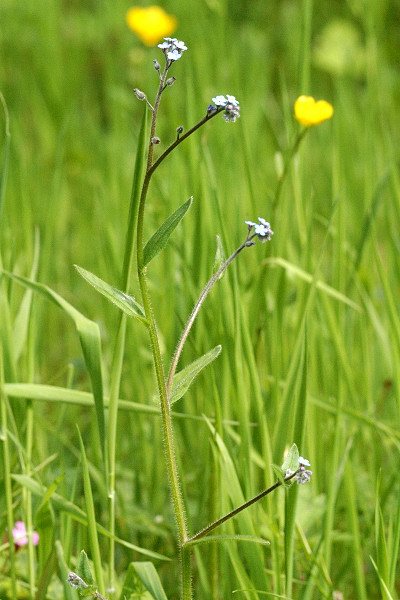

Scientific classification
- Kingdom: Plantae
- Clade: Tracheophytes
- Clade: Angiosperms
- Clade: Eudicots
- Clade: Asterids
- Order: Boraginales
- Family: Boraginaceae
- Genus: Myosotis
- Species: M. nemorosa

Binomial name
- Myosotis nemorosa Besser

= Myosotis nemorosa =

Species of flowering plant

Myosotis nemorosa (syn. Myosotis strigulosa) is a plant species of the genus Myosotis. They are native to most of mainland Europe.
