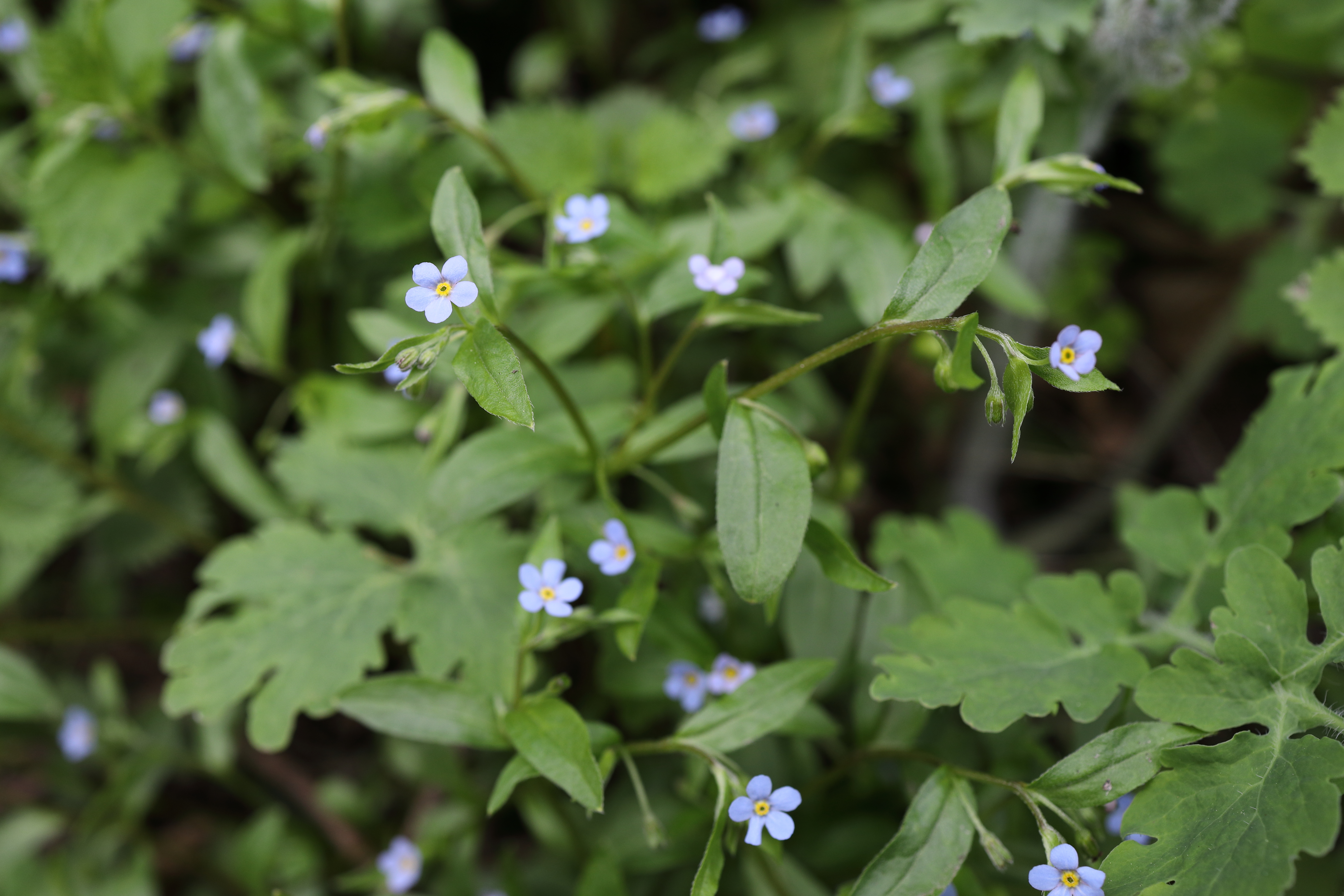

Scientific classification
- Kingdom: Plantae
- Clade: Tracheophytes
- Clade: Angiosperms
- Clade: Eudicots
- Clade: Asterids
- Order: Boraginales
- Family: Boraginaceae
- Genus: Myosotis
- Species: M. sparsiflora

Binomial name
- Myosotis sparsiflora J.C.Mikan ex Pohl

= Myosotis sparsiflora =

Species of flowering plant

Myosotis sparsiflora is an annual species of flowering plant belonging to the family Boraginaceae.

Its native range is from central Europe to south-western Siberia, as well as southern Finland.
