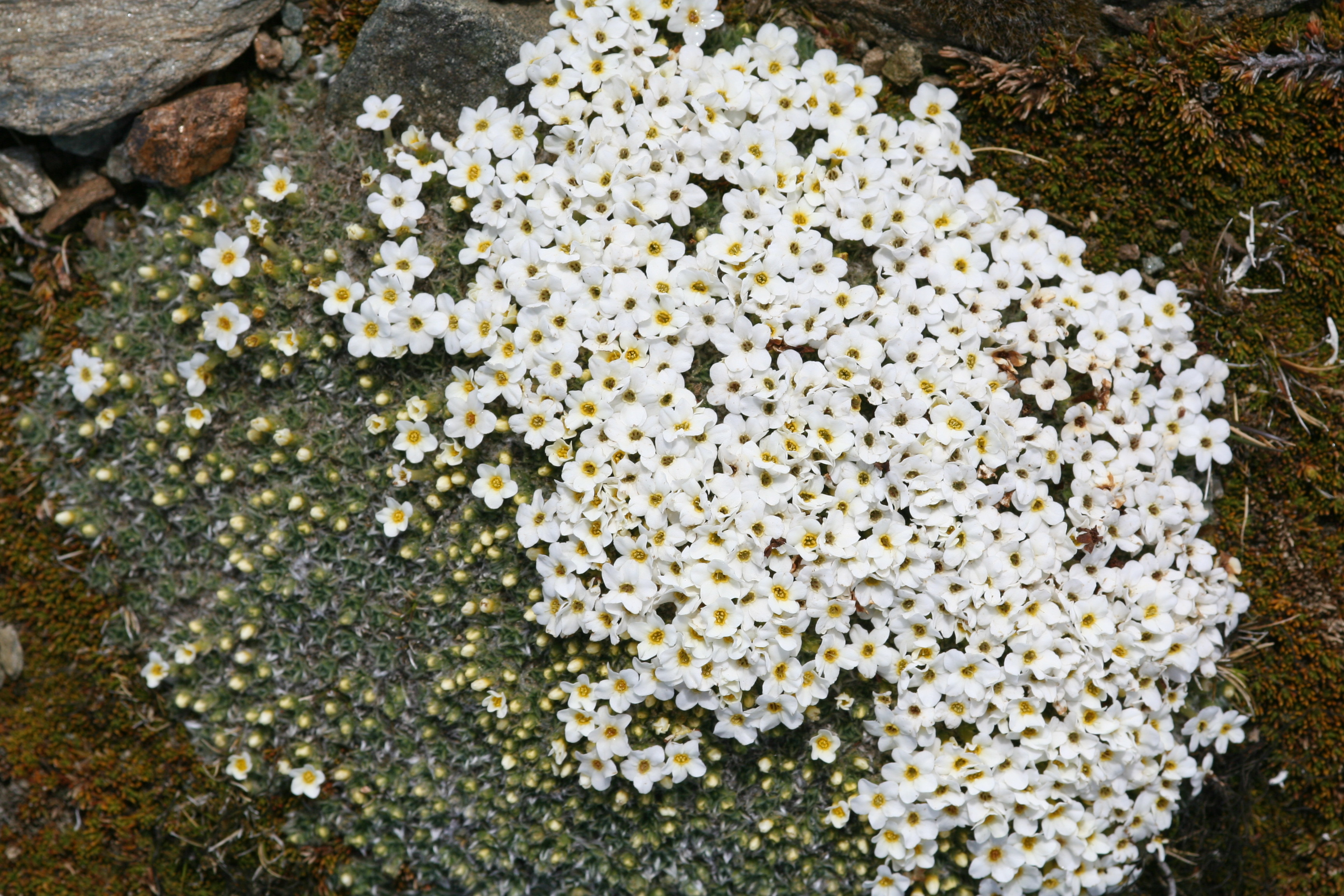
- Flowering Myosotis pulvinaris cushion

Conservation status
- Not Threatened (NZ TCS)

Scientific classification
- Kingdom: Plantae
- Clade: Tracheophytes
- Clade: Angiosperms
- Clade: Eudicots
- Clade: Asterids
- Order: Boraginales
- Family: Boraginaceae
- Genus: Myosotis
- Species: M. pulvinaris

Binomial name
- Myosotis pulvinaris Hook.f.

= Myosotis pulvinaris =

Species of flowering plant

Myosotis pulvinaris or the Cushion Forget-Me-Not is a species of flowering plant in the family Boraginaceae, endemic to the South Island of New Zealand. Joseph Dalton Hooker described the species in 1867. Plants of this species of forget-me-not are perennial with a prostrate, compact, cushion habit, short bracteate inflorescences, and white corollas.

== Taxonomy and etymology ==
Myosotis pulvinaris Hook.f. is in the plant family Boraginaceae and was described in 1867 by Joseph Dalton Hooker. On the one hand, it is morphologically most similar to the other two cushion- or mat-forming species, M. uniflora and M. glabrescens. Myosotis pulvinaris differs from M. uniflora in its white corollas, and from M. glabrescens in its short filaments and anthers which are only partially exserted (i.e. the tips only surpassing the faucal scales), and its short calyx lobes which are shorter than half the length of the calyx. M. pulvinaris is also similar to two other bracteate-prostrate species of Myosotis, M. retrorsa and M. lyallii. M. pulvinaris - together with M. glabrescens and M. uniflora - differ from these two species in their compact cushion or mat habit and short one-flowered inflorescences, as well as leaves that are spirally arranged, imbricate, sheathing, smaller, with the widest point at or below the middle, and with sparsely to densely distributed, untidy, flexuous hairs on the underside.

The type specimen of Myosotis pulvinaris is lodged at Kew Herbarium (K000787905).

The specific epithet, pulvinaris, is derived from Latin for cushion or pillow and refers to the cushion habit of this species.

== Phylogeny ==
Myosotis pulvinaris was shown to be a part of the monophyletic southern hemisphere lineage of Myosotis in phylogenetic analyses of standard DNA sequencing markers (nuclear ribosomal DNA and chloroplast DNA regions). Within the southern hemisphere lineage, species relationships were not well resolved. The four sequenced individuals of M. pulvinaris did not always form a monophyletic group, but they usually grouped with M. glabrescens and some of the other bracteate-prostrate species.

== Description ==
Myosotis pulvinaris plants are tightly compacted cushions that can reach 50 cm in diameter. The many imbricate rosette leaves have glabrous petioles 1–7 mm long. The rosette leaf blades are 1–6 mm long by 2–6 mm wide (length: width ratio 0.7–1.5: 1), broadly ovate to very broadly ovate, obovate to very broadly obovate, round, or orbicular, widest at or above the middle, with an obtuse apex. The upper and lower surfaces of the leaf are densely covered in long, flexuous, mostly appressed antrorse (forward-facing) hairs that are oriented parallel to the mid vein; the leaf margin has patent to erect hairs. Each rosette has few prostrate to ascending, once-branched, bracteate inflorescences that are up to 70 mm long. The cauline leaves are similar to the rosette leaves but smaller, and decrease in size toward the tip. Each inflorescence has a solitary flower, borne on a short pedicel, with a bract. The calyx is 3–5 mm long at flowering and 4–6 mm long at fruiting, lobed to a third to half its length, and densely covered in long, antrorse, flexuous, appressed hairs. The corolla is white, up to 10 mm in diameter, with a cylindrical tube, petals that are narrowly to very broadly obovate or ovate to very broadly ovate, and flat, and small yellow scales alternating with the petals. The anthers are partly exserted, with the tips only surpassing the scales. The four smooth, shiny, dark brown nutlets are 1.3–2.1 mm long by 0.7–1.0 mm wide and narrowly ovoid to ovoid in shape.

The chromosome number of M. pulvinaris is unknown.

M. pulvinaris has M. uniflora type pollen.

It flowers and fruits from October–April, with the main flowering period December–February and the main fruiting period January–March.

== Gallery ==
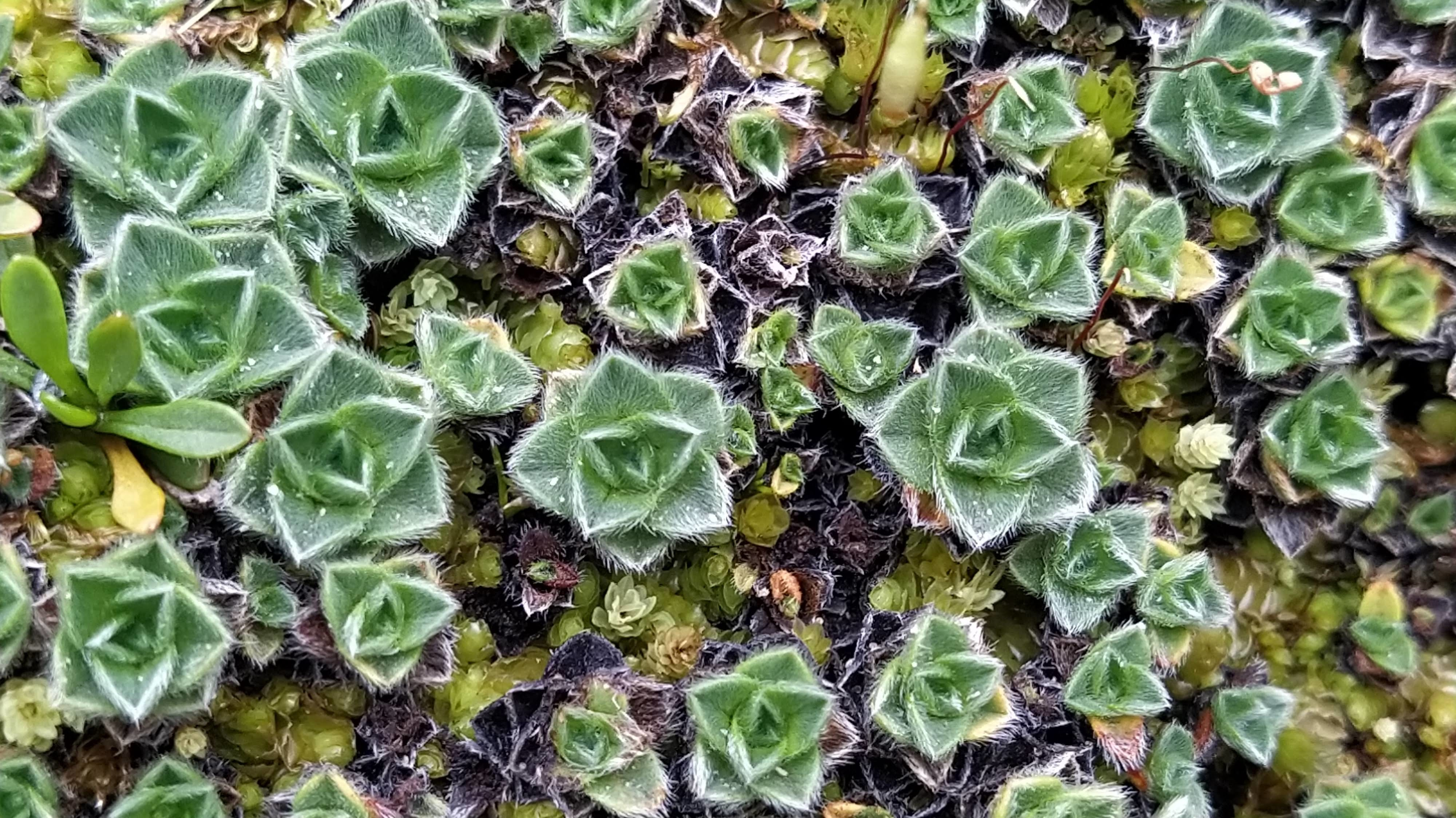
Close-up of leaves

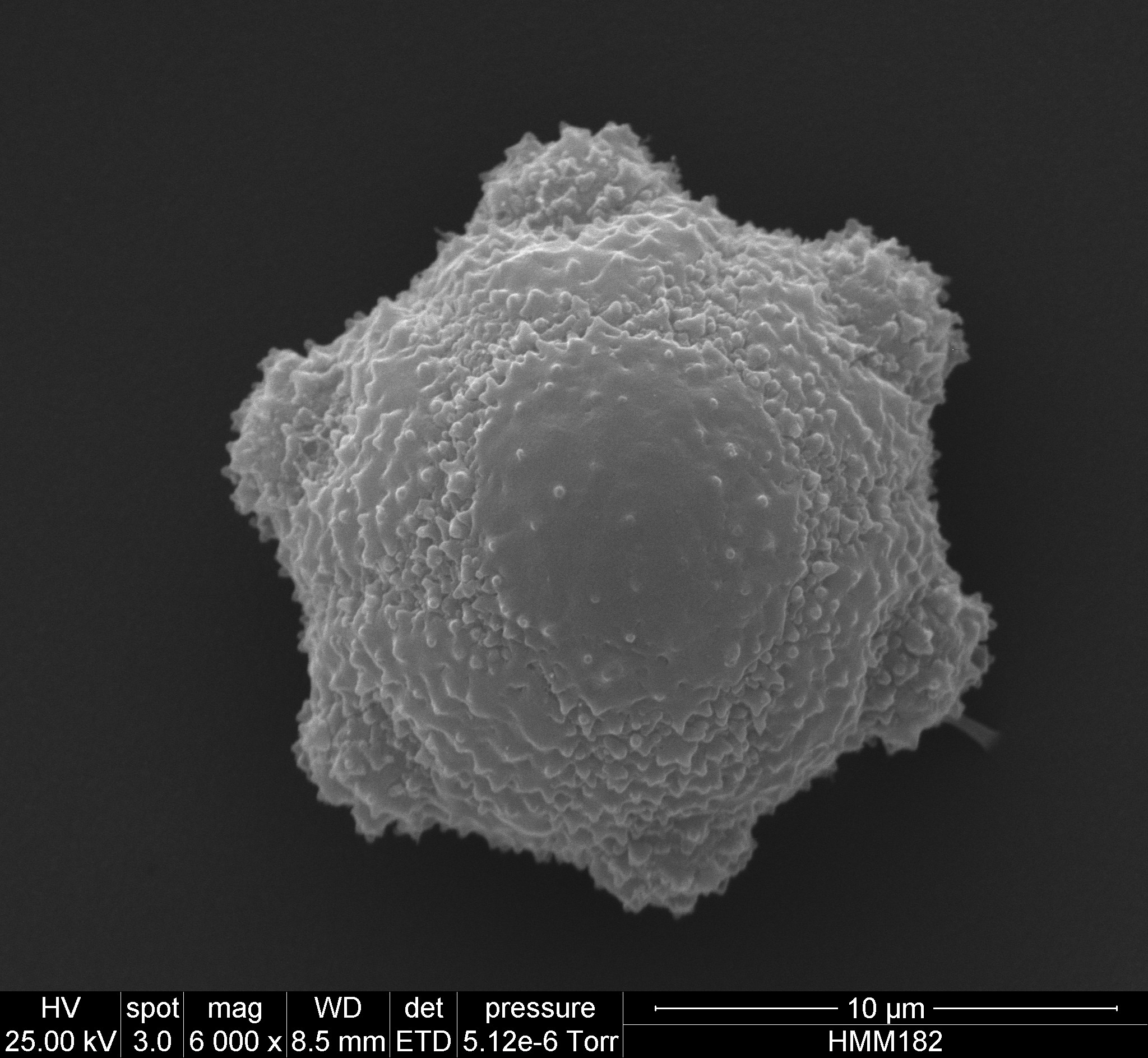
Pollen

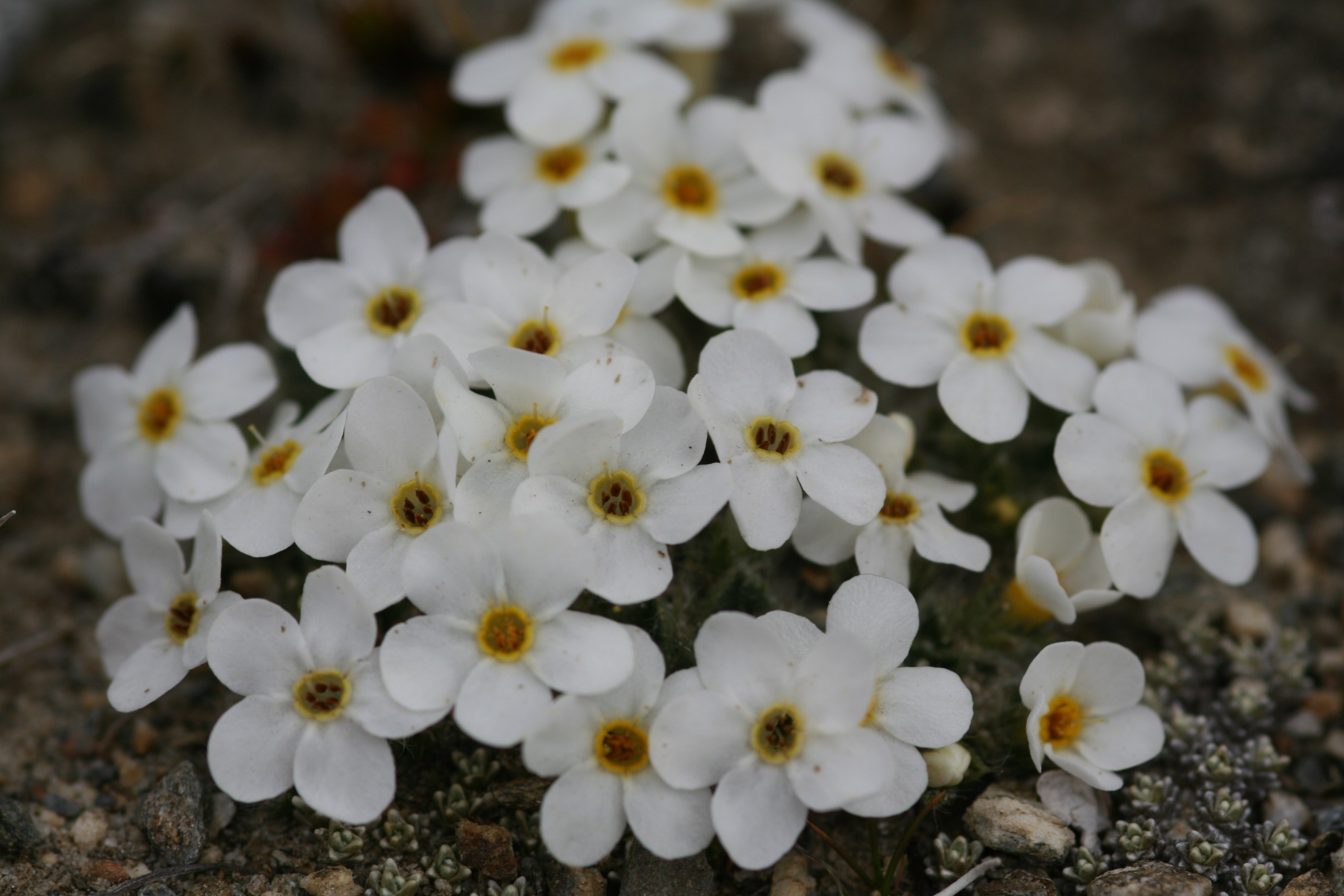
Close-up of flowers

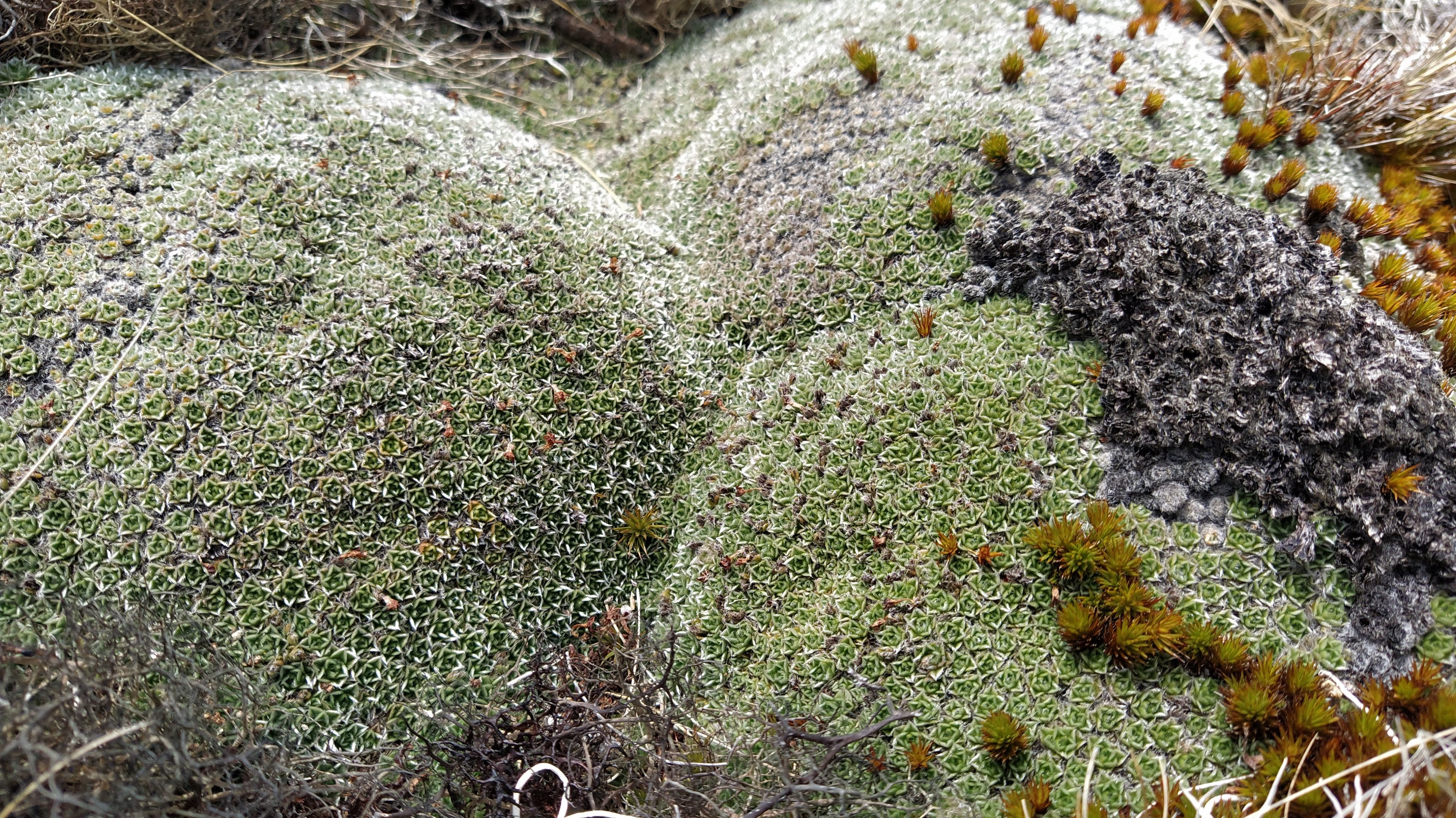
Large cushion habit

== Distribution and habitat ==
Myosotis pulvinaris is a forget-me-not endemic to the mountains of the South Island of New Zealand. It is mainly found in Otago, but is also known from Westland, Canterbury and Fiordland from 1020–2130 m ASL. M. pulvinaris is common and locally abundant in subalpine to alpine fellfields and cushionfields in these areas.

== Conservation status ==
The species is listed as "Not Threatened" on the most recent assessment (2017-2018) under the New Zealand Threatened Classification system for plants.
