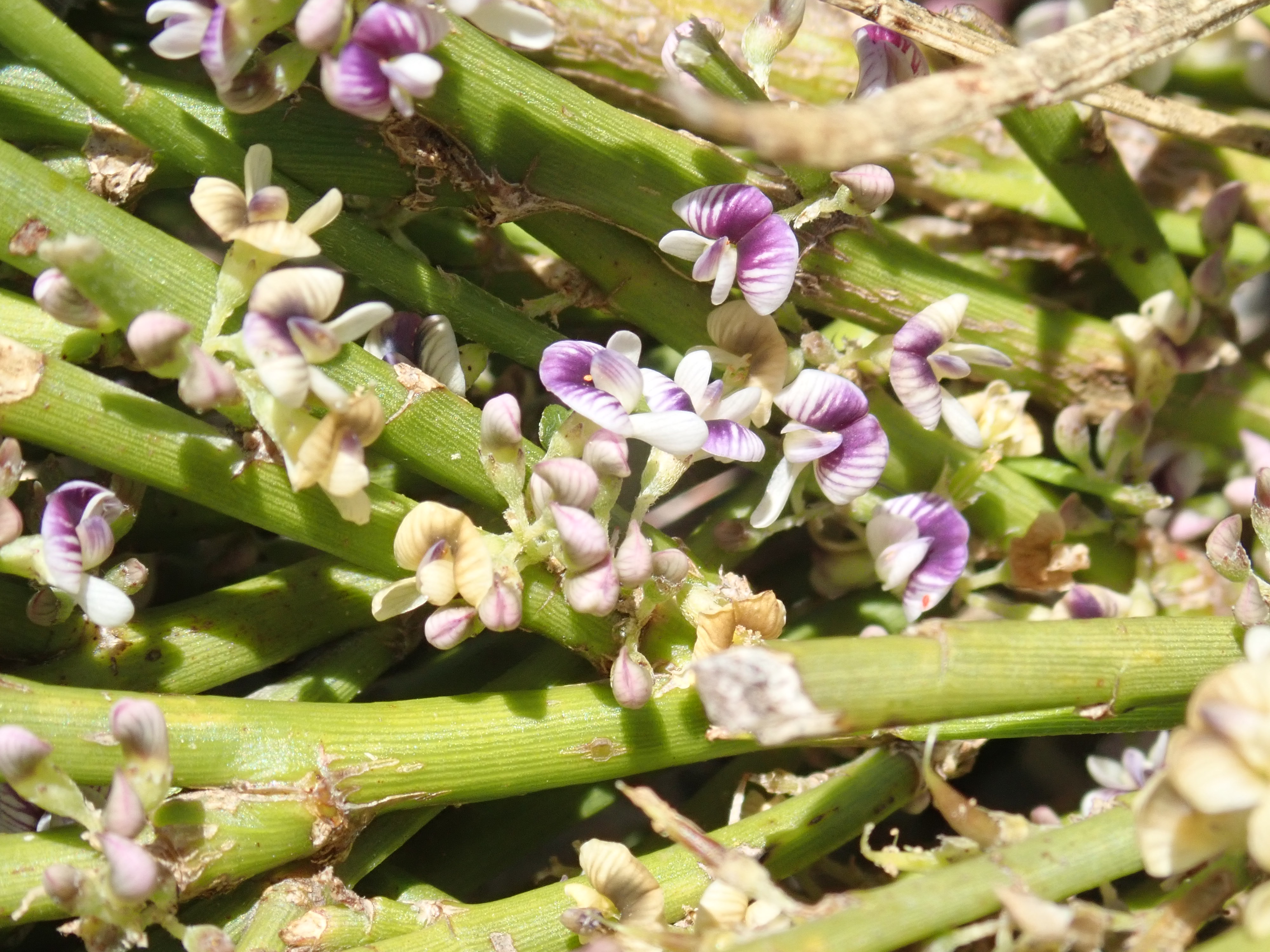
- Stems lying flat & flowers

Conservation status
- Nationally Vulnerable (NZ TCS)

Scientific classification
- Kingdom: Plantae
- Clade: Tracheophytes
- Clade: Angiosperms
- Clade: Eudicots
- Clade: Rosids
- Order: Fabales
- Family: Fabaceae
- Subfamily: Faboideae
- Genus: Carmichaelia
- Species: C. appressa

Binomial name
- Carmichaelia appressa G.Simpson
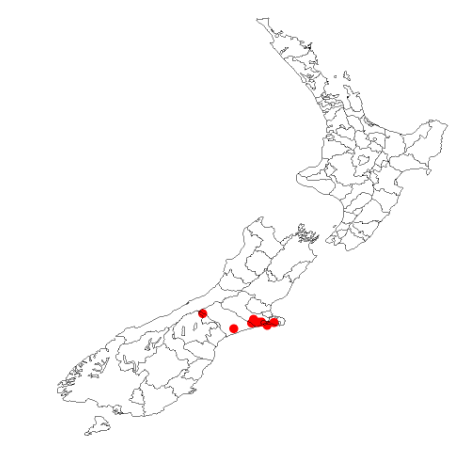
- Occurrence data from AVH

= Carmichaelia appressa =

Species of legume

Carmichaelia appressa (common name prostrate broom) is a species of pea in the family Fabaceae. It is endemic to New Zealand, and found only on Kaitorete Spit, Canterbury, South Island. Its conservation status (2023) is Threatened - Nationally Vulnerable under the New Zealand Threat Classification System.

== Description ==
Carmichaelia appressa is a "spreading, closely-branched plant... forming more or less circular mats to 2 m. diameter" which are closely pressed to the ground. It flowers in summer. C. appressa has a diploid chromosome number of 32.

== Taxonomy ==
C. appressa is in the family Fabaceae. The species was first described by New Zealand botanist George Simpson in 1945. The lectotype was collected by Simpson in February 1938 from Ellesmere Spit (Kaitorete Spit) Canterbury, South Island, New Zealand, and the lectotype and an isolectotype are housed at the Allan Herbarium in Lincoln. There are additional isolectotypes at herbaria at the Auckland War Memorial Museum, Museum of New Zealand Te Papa Tongarewa, and the Royal Botanic Garden, Edinburgh.

A phylogenetic study based on morphological and anatomical characters placed C. appressa in a group with other species with a glabrous (hairless) style, small keel, and wings longer than the keel, together with C. arborea, C. australis, C. exsul, C. nana, C. odorata, and C. petriei.

The species epithet appressa refers to the habit of the plant, which has branches pressed flat to the ground.

== Distribution and habitat ==
C. appressa is endemic to New Zealand, and found only on Kaitorete Spit, Canterbury, South Island, including inside Katorete Spit Scientific Reserve. Its habitat is "shingle beaches close to the sea". including stabilised sand dunes and ridges, and gravelly sandy loam.

== Ecology ==
Carmichaelia appressa and C. australis are hosts for the native aphid Megoura stufkensi. C. appressa is also used by the katipō (Latrodectus katipo) for its snares and retreats, and it may be a host for the threatened endemic moth Scythris niphozela.

== Conservation status and threats ==
The species is listed as Threatened - Nationally Vulnerable in the most recent assessment (2023) of the New Zealand Threatened Classification for plants. This status is worse than the previous listing as At Risk - Naturally Uncommon listing in the 2017 assessment because the species is in actual decline.

In addition to qualifiers RR ("Range restricted"), DPT (Data Poor: Trend), OL ("One location"), and RF ("Recruitment failure"), C. appressa also has the qualifier CI ("Climate impact"). The CI qualifier has been used by the Department of Conservation since 2021 to flag species in its conservation assessments that are "adversely affected by long-term climate trends and/or extreme climatic events."

In addition to the impact of a changing climate, other threats to Carmichaelia appressa include competition from other plants, especially non-natives such as marram grass, browsing by introduced hares and rabbits, and human disturbance to its habitat via sand excavation and off-road driving of four-wheel drive vehicles.

== Gallery ==
Close up of flowers

Leafless branches

Low growing habit

Habit

Flowers
