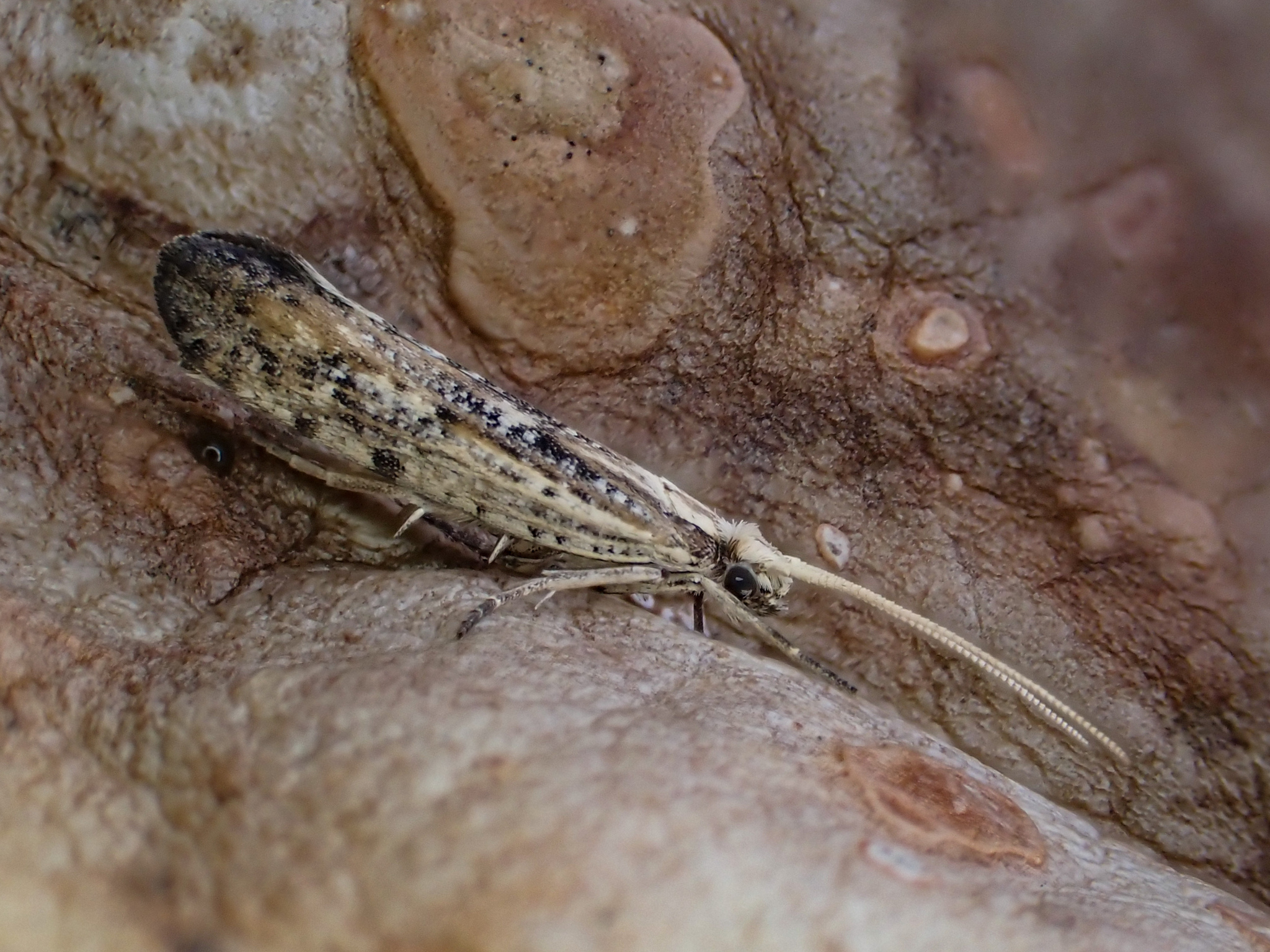

Scientific classification
- Kingdom: Animalia
- Phylum: Arthropoda
- Clade: Pancrustacea
- Class: Insecta
- Order: Lepidoptera
- Family: Plutellidae
- Genus: Orthenches
- Species: O. chlorocoma

Binomial name
- Orthenches chlorocoma Meyrick, 1885

Synonyms
- Orthenches chlorocroma Meyrick, 1885

= Orthenches chlorocoma =

Species of moth endemic to New Zealand

Orthenches chlorocoma is a moth of the family Plutellidae first described by Edward Meyrick in 1885. It is endemic to New Zealand and has been observed in the North and South Islands. The larvae of this species feed on native broom species in the genus Carmichaelia including Carmichaelia australis. Adults are on the wing in September, October and February.

== Taxonomy ==
This species was first described by Edward Meyrick in November 1885 when a summary of his forecoming 1886 paper was published. In that publication the species was named as Orthenches chlorocroma. In 1886 Meyrick described this species in greater detail and used the name Orthenches chlorocoma. Meyrick used larvae collected in Christchurch from whom he bred one adult specimen in April. George Hudson discussed and illustrated this species in his 1928 book The butterflies and moths of New Zealand. Hudson went on to give a description of the behaviour of this species in 1939. J. S. Dugdale considered this species when describing the genus Chrysorthenches. The male holotype is held at the Natural History Museum, London.

== Description ==
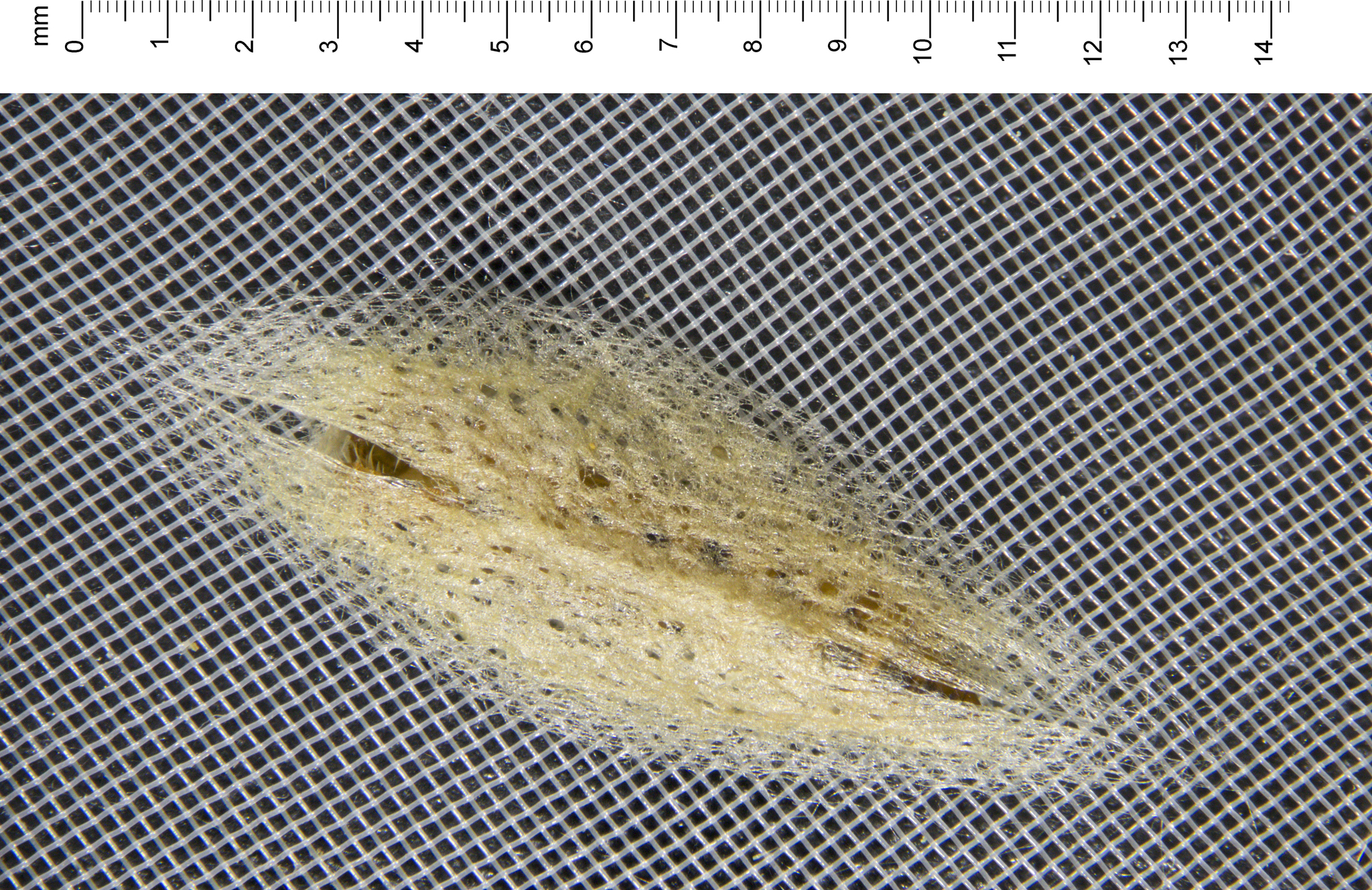
O. chlorocoma cocoon

Meyrick described the larva and pupa of this species as follows:

Larva 16-legged, slender, attenuated towards both extremities, especially posteriorly; whitish-brown or whitish-green; a straight slender dorsal line and two rather irregular ill-defined lines on each side of it ochreous-brown or green, according to ground colour; beneath these a rather broad yellowish-white spiracular line; space beneath this dull brown; spots minute, black; head grey-whitish or greenish-whitish, irregularly striped longitudinally with dark fuscous. Pupa in a rather thin firm spindle-shaped cocoon.

Meyrick described the adult of the species as follows:

Male. — 15 mm. Head and antennae pale whitish-yellowish. Palpi moderate, yellow whitish, second joint with a dark grey subapical band, terminal joint as long as second. Thorax pale whitish-yellowish, sides brownish. Abdomen ochreous-whitish. Legs fuscous, beneath whitish, anterior pair blackish. Fore-wings elongate, narrow, costa slightly sinuate, apex and hind-margin rounded; fuscous- whitish, towards costa and base slightly yellowish-tinged, with thin irregular blackish irroration through-out, tending to accumulate in small spots, especially on margins; a small round black spot in disc at 2/3 : cilia pale whitish-yellowish, suffusedly barred with blackish-grey. Hindwings elongate-ovate, with a scaled membranous ridge along lower median vein beneath; grey-whitish; cilia grey-whitish, at apex pale whitish-yellowish, with a blackish-grey spot.

== Distribution ==
This species is endemic to New Zealand and has been observed in the North and South Islands. It has been collected at such locations as Auckland, Mount Taranaki, French Pass, Gore Bay, Waiho Gorge and Christchurch.

== Habitat and hosts ==
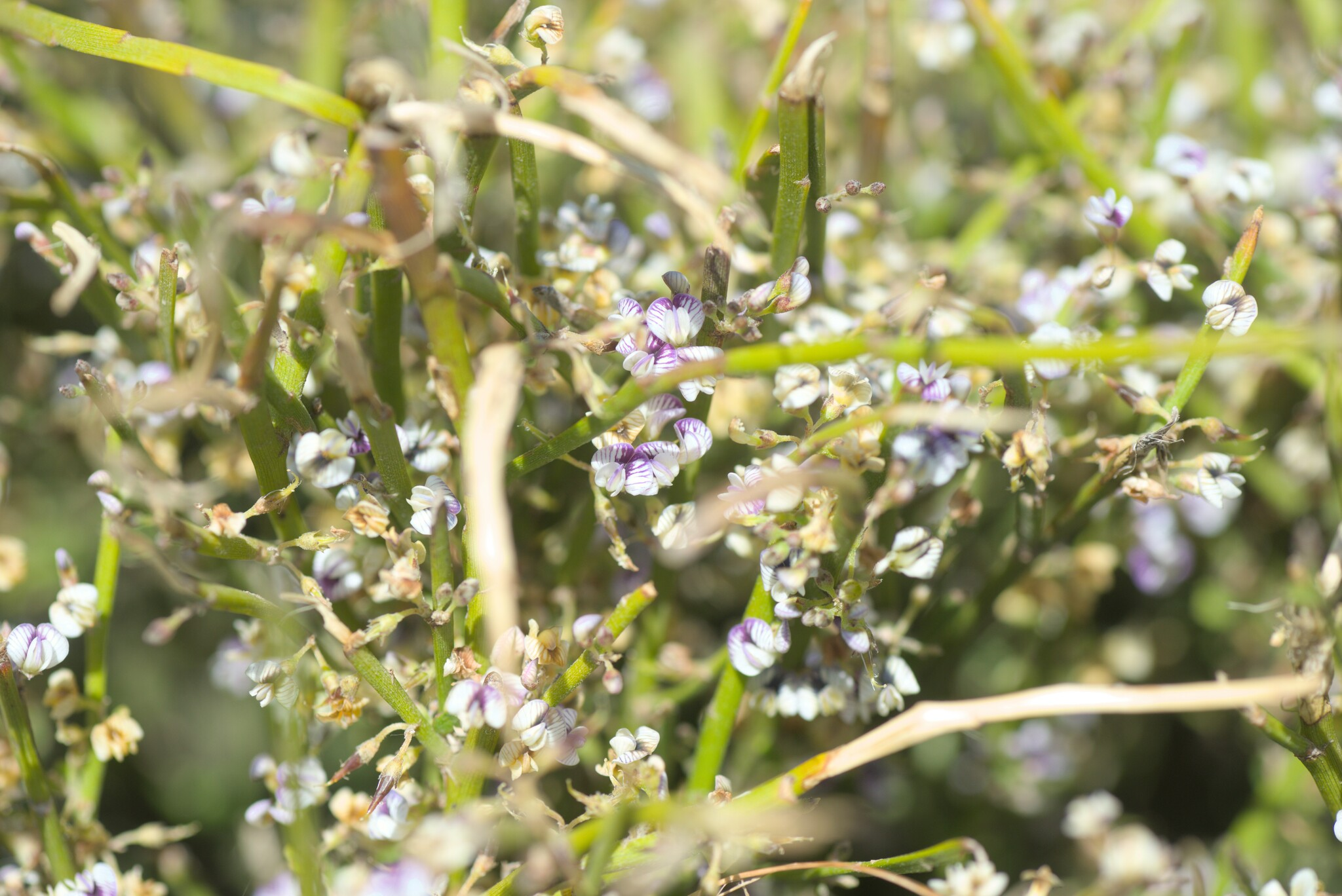
Larval host C. australis.

This species feeds on native broom species in the genus Carmichaelia including Carmichaelia australis.

== Behaviour ==
Larvae rest full length on the leafless stalks of its food plant. When disturbed the larvae can be very active. When at rest adult moths stand on fore- and intermediate legs, with wings wrapped around hind-body and the antennae placed close together, extended, forwards in a line with the body, and closely appressed to the object on which the moth is resting. The hind-body, together with wings, is held rigidly upwards at an angle of about 35 degrees. In this position the insect exactly resembles a dead twig of broom. Adults are on the wing in September, October and February.
