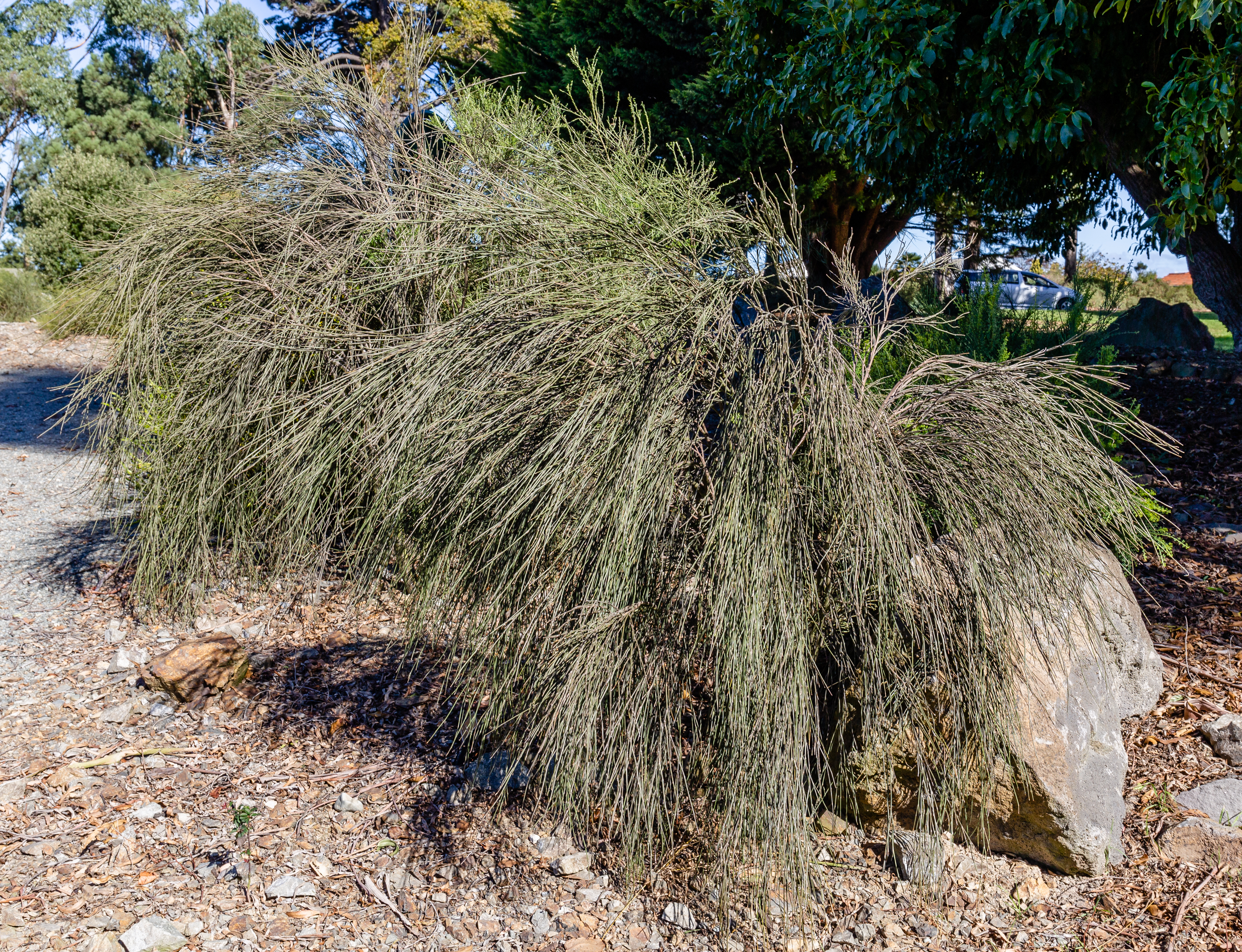

Conservation status
- Critically Endangered (IUCN 2.3)

- Nationally Endangered (NZ TCS)

Scientific classification
- Kingdom: Plantae
- Clade: Tracheophytes
- Clade: Angiosperms
- Clade: Eudicots
- Clade: Rosids
- Order: Fabales
- Family: Fabaceae
- Subfamily: Faboideae
- Genus: Carmichaelia
- Species: C. muritai

Binomial name
- Carmichaelia muritai (A.W.Purdie) Heenan
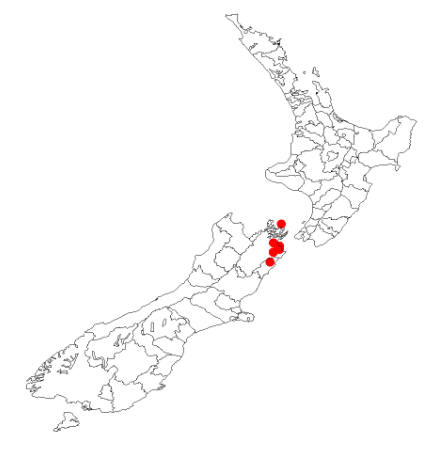
- Occurrence data from AVH

Synonyms
- Chordospartium muritai A.W.Purdie

= Carmichaelia muritai =

Species of legume

Carmichaelia muritai, or coastal tree broom or Clifford Bay broom, is a species of plant in the family Fabaceae. It is a shrub that is endemic to the South Island of New Zealand, and found only near Clifford Bay in Marlborough. The species is listed as Threatened - Nationally Endangered by the New Zealand Threat Classification System.

== Description ==
Shrub or small tree with a stout trunk. Branches numerous, erect to drooping. Leaves lacking or reduced to scales. Racemes of flowers up to 7 cm long. Flowers 4 mm long with hairy calyx, white petals with purple markings and veins. Fruits are upturned greyish-white pods 3.5 mm long by 2 mm wide with 1-2 yellow-green seeds per pod, 1.5 mm long by 1 mm wide.

== Taxonomy ==
Carmichaelia muritai is in the family Fabaceae. It was first described in 1985 by New Zealand botanist Andrew Purdie as Chordospartium muritai. In 1998, New Zealand botanist Peter Heenan assigned it to the genus, Carmichaelia. Its common name is coastal tree broom or Clifford Bay broom.

A phylogenetic study based on morphological and anatomical characters placed C. muritai in a group with C. stevensonii and C. crassicaulis.

C. muritai (as Chordospartium muritai) has a diploid chromosome number of 32.

== Distribution and habitat ==
C. muritai is endemic to the South Island of New Zealand. It is only found in coastal forest at Clifford Bay in Marlborough. It is found on loess and gravel and on colluvial fans below or near eroded cliffs.

== Conservation status ==
In 1998, C. muritai was declared "critically endangered" under IUCN2.3 (with just 12 plants existing in the wild), and in 2005 it was classified as Threatened - Nationally Critical under the New Zealand Threat Classification System. Since 2012 and including in the most recent assessment for vascular plants (2023), the species is listed as Threatened - Nationally Endangered.

In addition to qualifiers RR ("Range restricted"), DPT ("Data Poor: Trend) and CD ("Conservation dependent"), C. muritai also has the qualifier CI ("Climate impact"). The CI qualifier has been used by the Department of Conservation since 2021 to flag species in its conservation assessments that are "adversely affected by long-term climate trends and/or extreme climatic events."

There are just two small natural populations known, and one of them has multiple threats, including drought, erosion, weeds, and browsing by goats, whereas the other population is threatened by fire. In general, browsing by introduced mammals (particularly, goats, possums, hares and rabbits) is a big problem for C. muritai.
