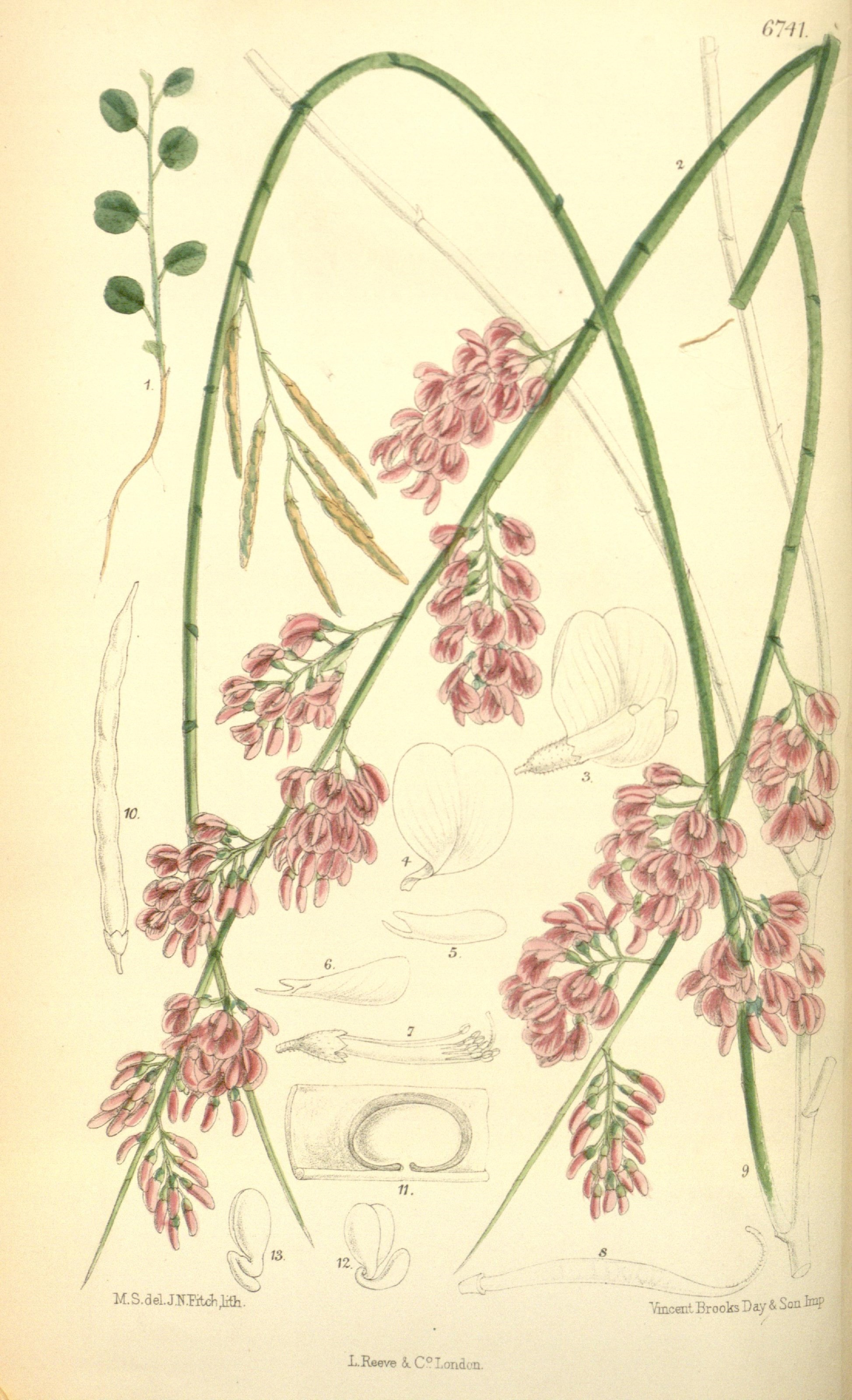

Conservation status
- Nationally Critical (NZ TCS)

Scientific classification
- Kingdom: Plantae
- Clade: Tracheophytes
- Clade: Angiosperms
- Clade: Eudicots
- Clade: Rosids
- Order: Fabales
- Family: Fabaceae
- Subfamily: Faboideae
- Genus: Carmichaelia
- Species: C. carmichaeliae

Binomial name
- Carmichaelia carmichaeliae (Hook.f.) Heenan
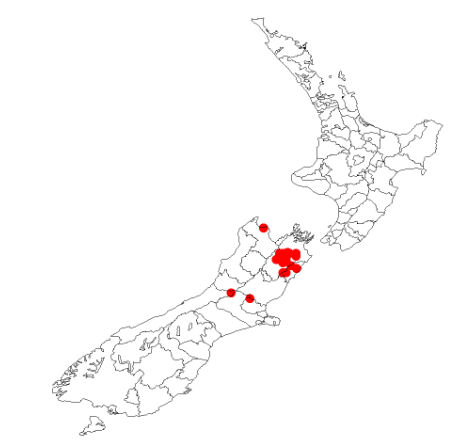
- Occurrence data from AVH

Synonyms
- Notospartium carmichaeliae Hook.f.

= Carmichaelia carmichaeliae =

Species of legume

Carmichaelia carmichaeliae, also known as Marlborough pink broom or just pink broom, is a species of plant in the family Fabaceae. It is endemic to New Zealand, found only in the South Island. It is classified as having the "Nationally Critical" conservation status under the New Zealand Threat Classification System.

== Description ==
A shrub that grows up to 4 m tall, C. carmichaeliae has drooping green-yellow twigs with no leaves. Its small pink flowers have dark streaks clustered into sprays.

== Taxonomy ==
The species was originally described with the name Notospartium carmichaeliae by Joseph Dalton Hooker in 1899. It was revised as C. carmichaeliae by Peter Brian Heenan in 1998.

== Distribution and habitat ==
C. carmichaeliae is endemic to the Marlborough region of New Zealand's South Island, north of the Awatere Fault. It is usually found in steep valleys and gorges or on cliff faces at up to around 800 m elevation.

== Ecology and threats ==
C. carmichaeliae flowers between November and January, and fruits all year long. The seeds are dispersed by wind and seed predation.

The species is highly threatened, considered "Nationally Critical" under the New Zealand Threat Classification System. Threats include browsing by introduced animals, competition from weeds, and aerial spraying of invasive plants such as gorse.

== Gallery ==
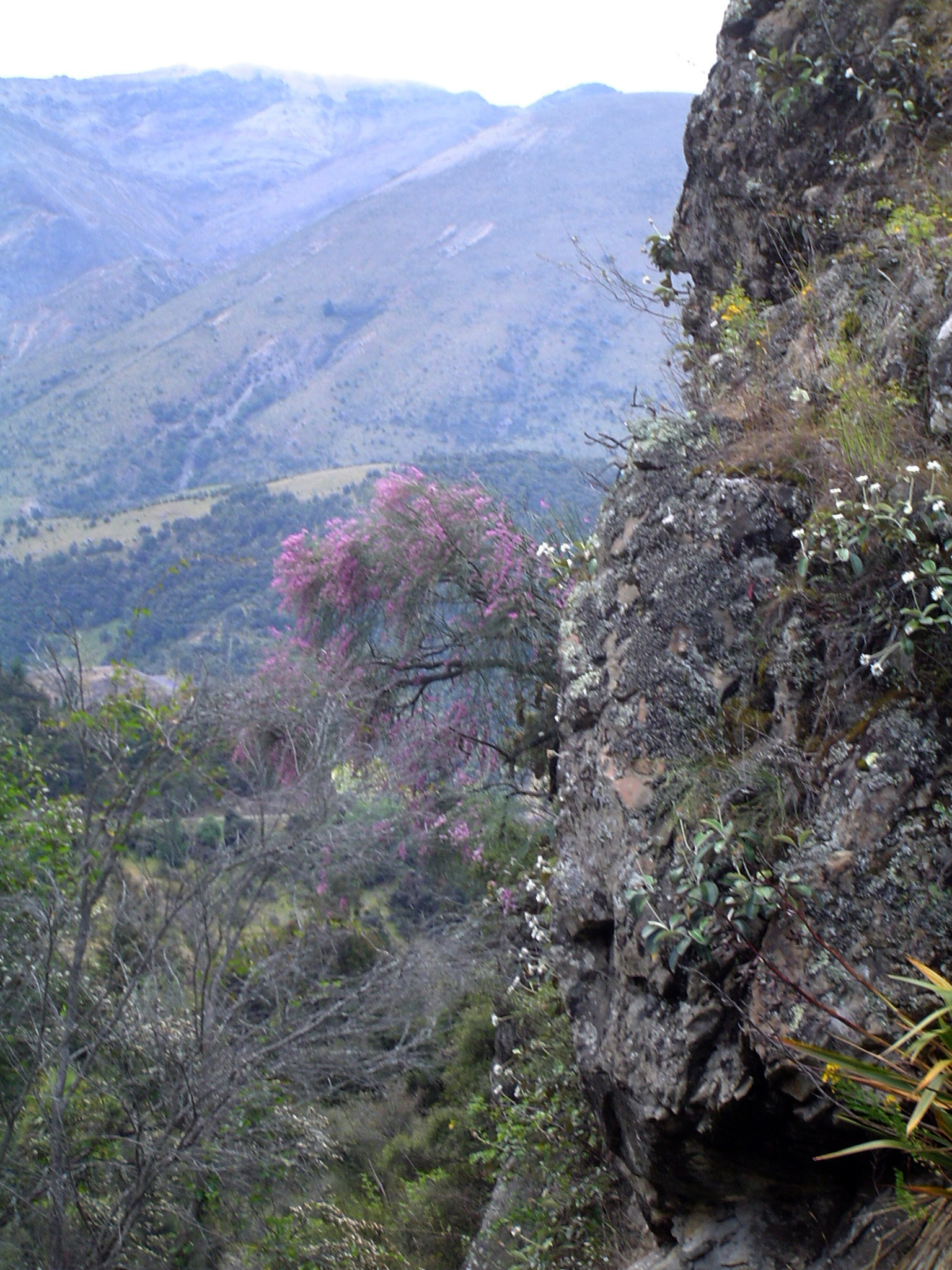

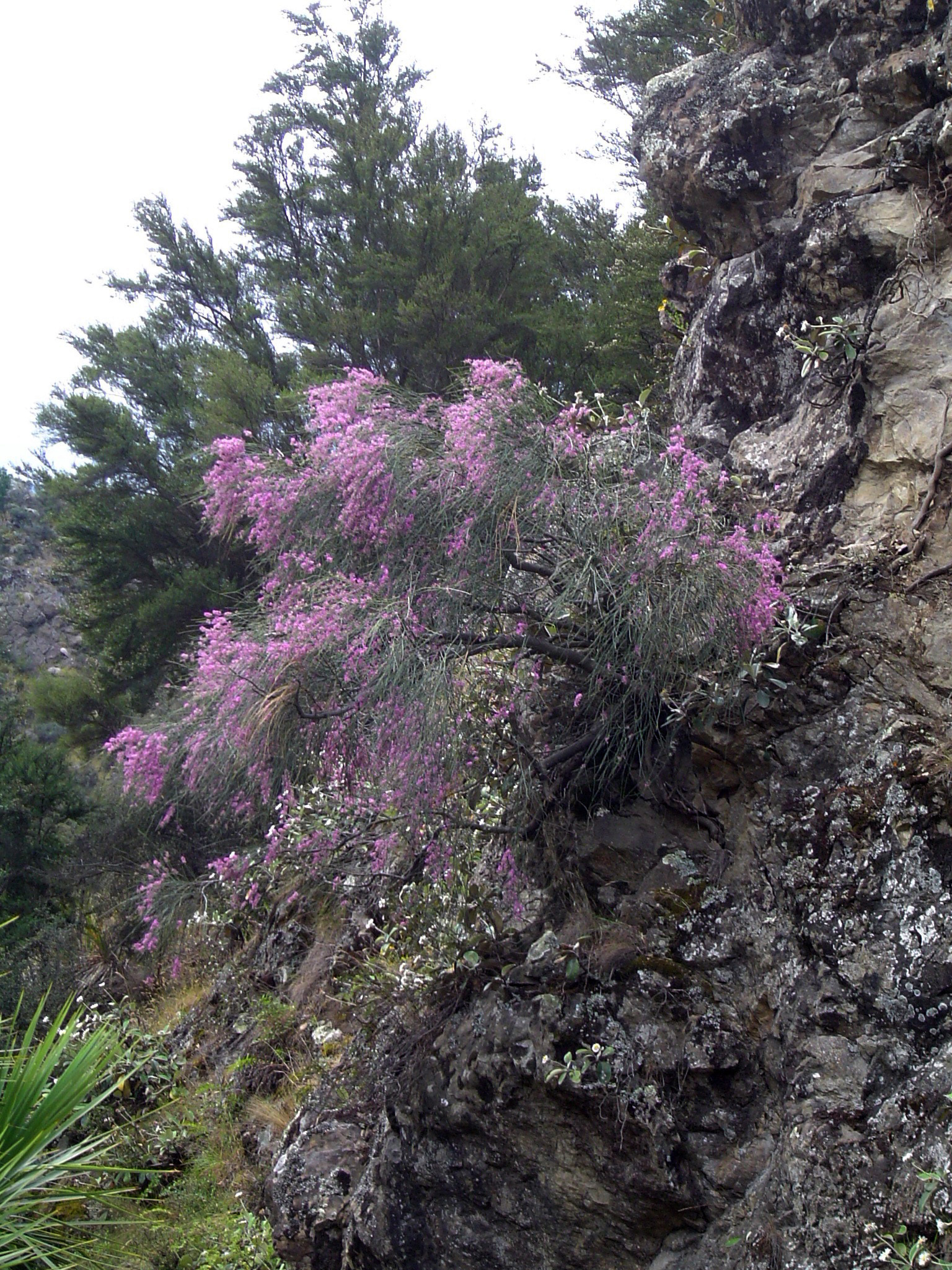

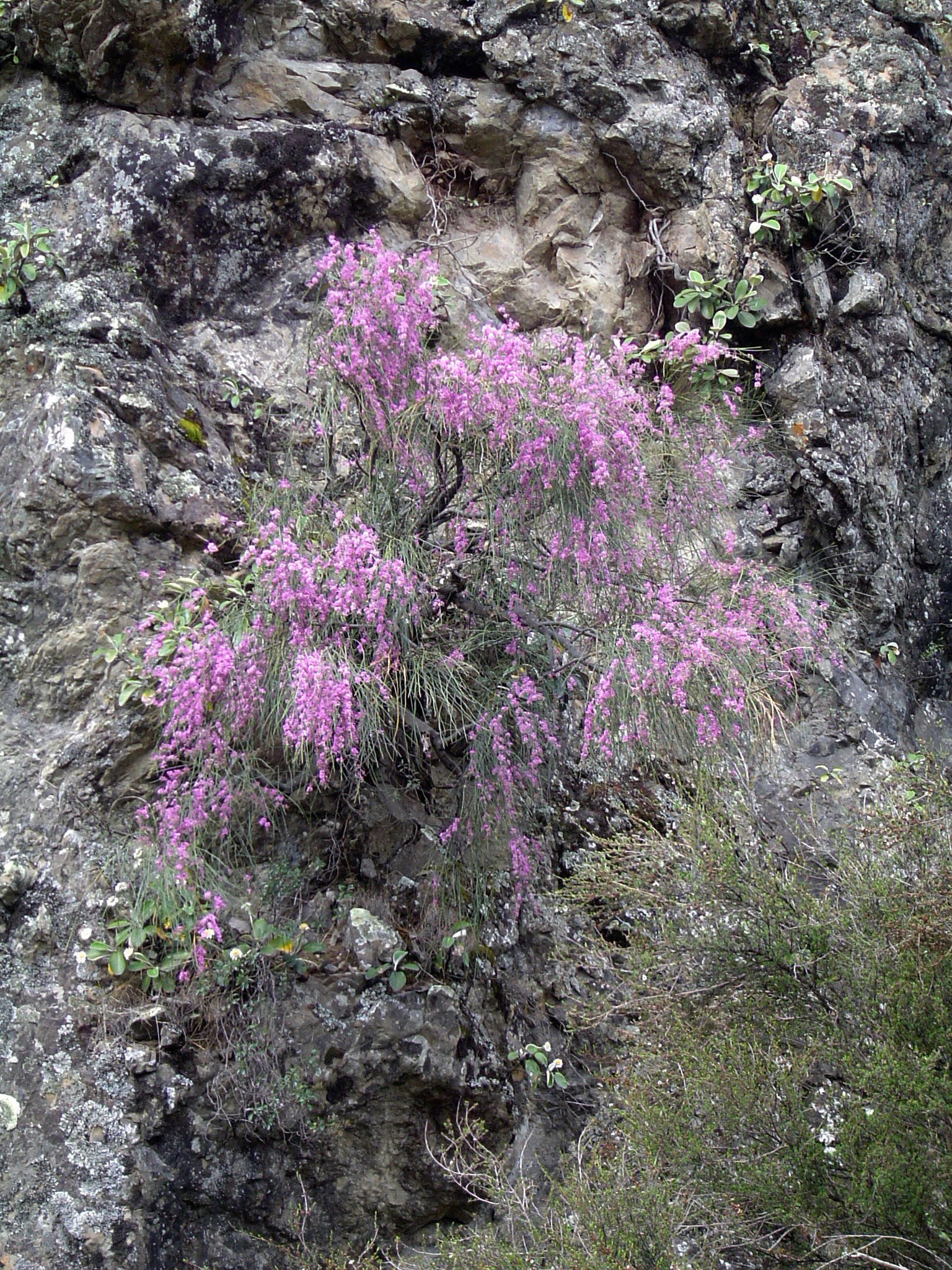

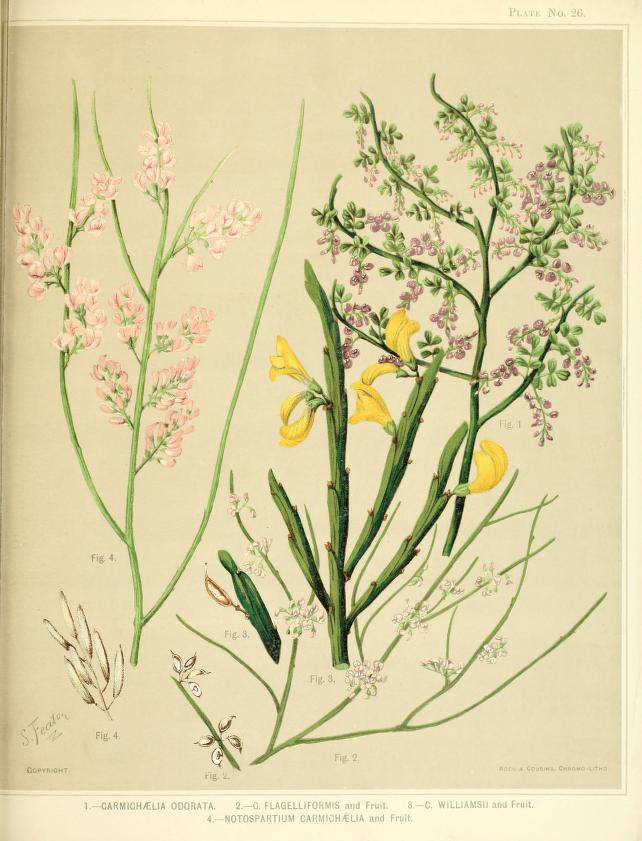
