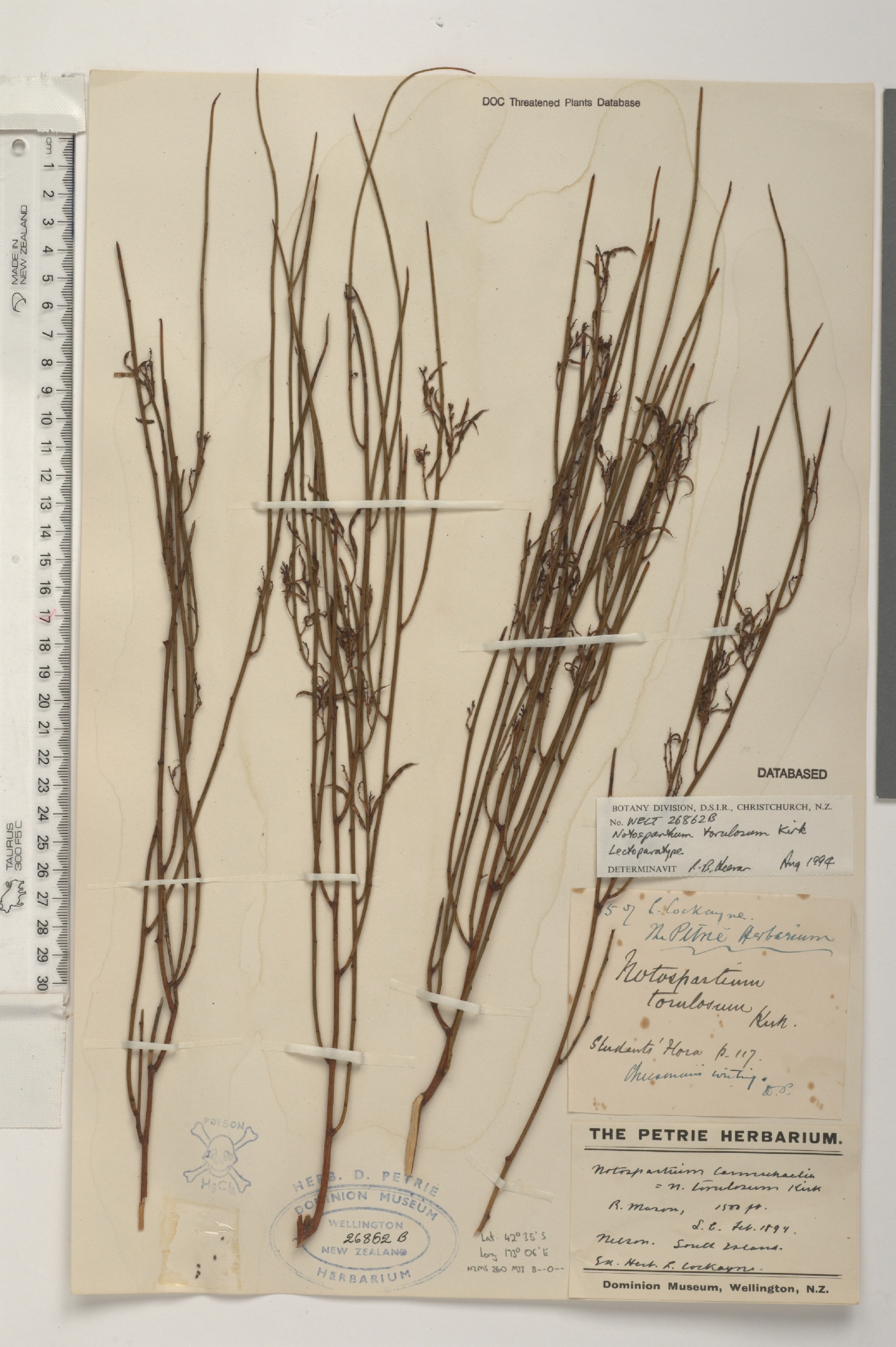

Conservation status
- Nationally Critical (NZ TCS)

Scientific classification
- Kingdom: Plantae
- Clade: Tracheophytes
- Clade: Angiosperms
- Clade: Eudicots
- Clade: Rosids
- Order: Fabales
- Family: Fabaceae
- Subfamily: Faboideae
- Genus: Carmichaelia
- Species: C. torulosa

Binomial name
- Carmichaelia torulosa (Kirk) Heenan
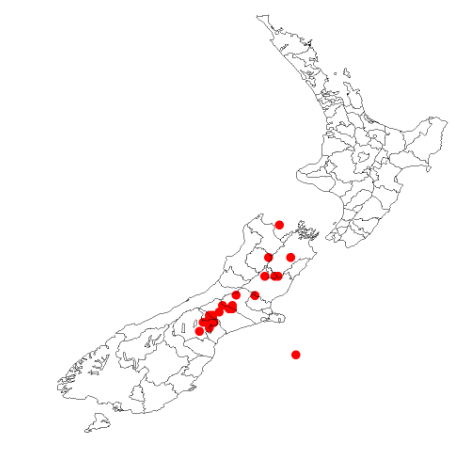
- Occurrence data from AVH

Synonyms
- Notospartium torulosum Kirk

= Carmichaelia torulosa =

Species of legume

Carmichaelia torulosa is a species of plant in the family Fabaceae. It is found only in New Zealand.

== Conservation status ==
The IUCN redlist lists it as "near threatened", with the major threat being habitat loss. The New Zealand Threat Classification System (NZTCS) listed it as "Threatened - Nationally Endangered" in 2013, and in 2017 as "Threatened - Nationally Critical".
