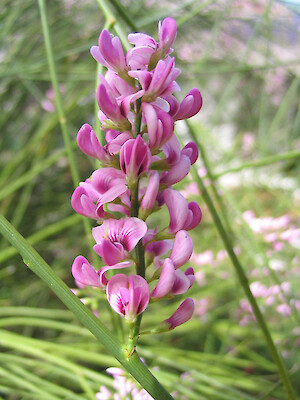
- Flowers of Carmichaelia glabrescens

Conservation status
- Near Threatened (IUCN 2.3)

Scientific classification
- Kingdom: Plantae
- Clade: Tracheophytes
- Clade: Angiosperms
- Clade: Eudicots
- Clade: Rosids
- Order: Fabales
- Family: Fabaceae
- Subfamily: Faboideae
- Genus: Carmichaelia
- Species: C. glabrescens

Binomial name
- Carmichaelia glabrescens (Petrie) Heenan
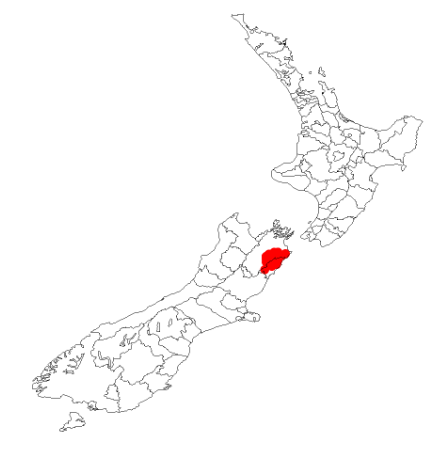
- Occurrence data from AVH

Synonyms
- Notospartium glabrescens Petrie

= Carmichaelia glabrescens =

Species of legume

Carmichaelia glabrescens is a species of plant in the family Fabaceae. It was first described by Donald Petrie in 1921 and was formally known as Notospartium glabrescens.

It is found only in New Zealand mostly in the South Island in south Marlborough.

In 2006, using IUCN2.3 criteria it was declared "Near threatened", but in 2018 was declared "not threatened" under the New Zealand Threat Classification System.

The flowers of this plant are red/pink.

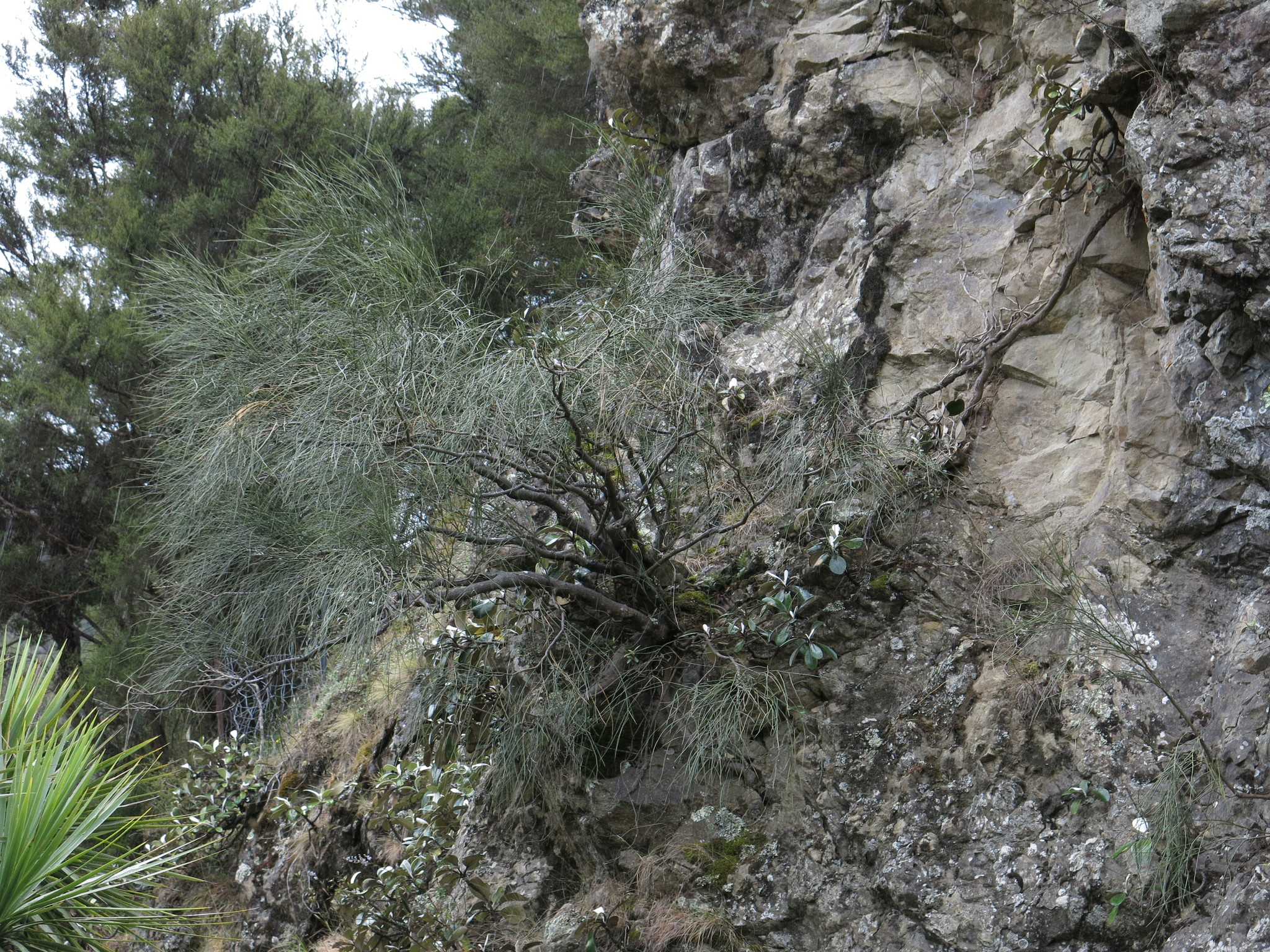
Carmichaelia glabrescens
