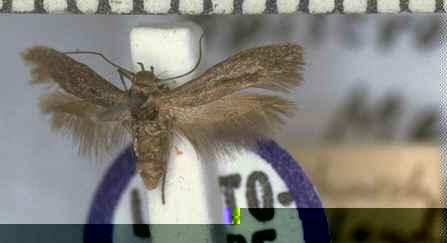
- Lectotype

Scientific classification
- Kingdom: Animalia
- Phylum: Arthropoda
- Class: Insecta
- Order: Lepidoptera
- Family: Scythrididae
- Genus: Scythris
- Species: S. epistrota

Binomial name
- Scythris epistrota (Meyrick, 1889)

Synonyms
- Butalis epistrota Meyrick, 1889; Elachista lacustris Philpott, 1930; Scythris lacustris (Philpott, 1930)

= Scythris epistrota =

Species of moth endemic to New Zealand

Scythris epistrota is a species of moth in the family Scythrididae first described by Edward Meyrick in 1889. It is endemic to New Zealand and has been observed in the South Island. The larvae have been found on species of New Zealand broom and they pupate within an irregularly shaped, dense, silken cocoon. Adults are day flying and are on the wing from November until February.

== Taxonomy ==
This species was first described by Edward Meyrick in 1889 and named Butalis epistrota. Meyrick used specimens collected on the Port Hills in Christchurch and at Mount Arthur in January when first describing this species. In 1928 George Hudson discussed this species in his book The Butterflies and Moths of New Zealand. However John S. Dugdale pointed out that both the description and illustration given in that book by Hudson related to an undescribed species from Mount Arthur. In 1930, thinking he was describing a new species, Alfred Philpott named this species Elachista laucstris. Meyrick synonymised this name with S. epistrota in 1931. Hudson confirmed this synonymy in 1939. The male lectotype is held at the Natural History Museum, London.

== Description ==
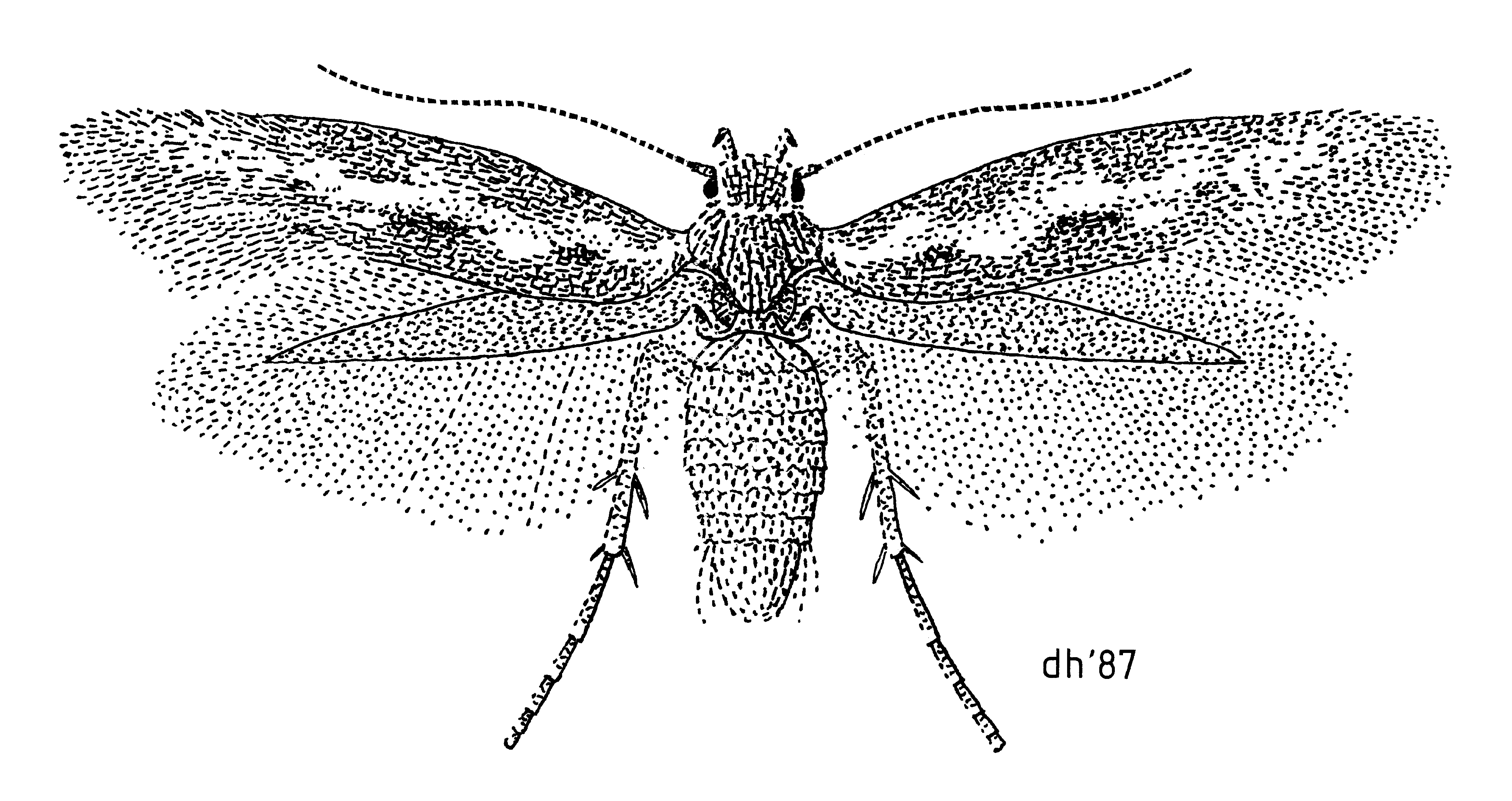
Illustration of S. epistrota

Meyrick described this species as follows:

♂ ♀. 10–11mm. Head, palpi, antennae, thorax, abdomen, and legs rather dark grey, slightly bronzy-tinged, generally somewhat sprinkled with whitish; antennal ciliations ½; abdomen in female whitish beneath. Forewings lanceolate; rather dark bronzy-grey, more or less densely strewn with whitish scales; in paler specimens there are indications of two very ill-defined inwardly oblique darker streaks on anterior half, more distinctly spotted with darker on fold, and two less perceptible outwardly oblique streaks on posterior half; an obscure round dark fuscous dot in disc at ¾: cilia pale bronzy-grey. Hindwings ⅔ grey; cilia 2, pale bronzy-grey.

== Distribution ==
This species is endemic to New Zealand. Other than the type locality of the Port Hills near Christchurch, this species has been observed in Kaikōura, near Lake Pukaki, in Twizel, and in Queenstown.

== Behaviour ==
The larvae emerge from their eggs during October to December. The larvae pupate in an irregularly shaped, dense, silken cocoon. The adults of this species are day flying and are on the wing from November until February. This species has been collected via hand collecting and Malaise trapping.

== Habitat and hosts ==
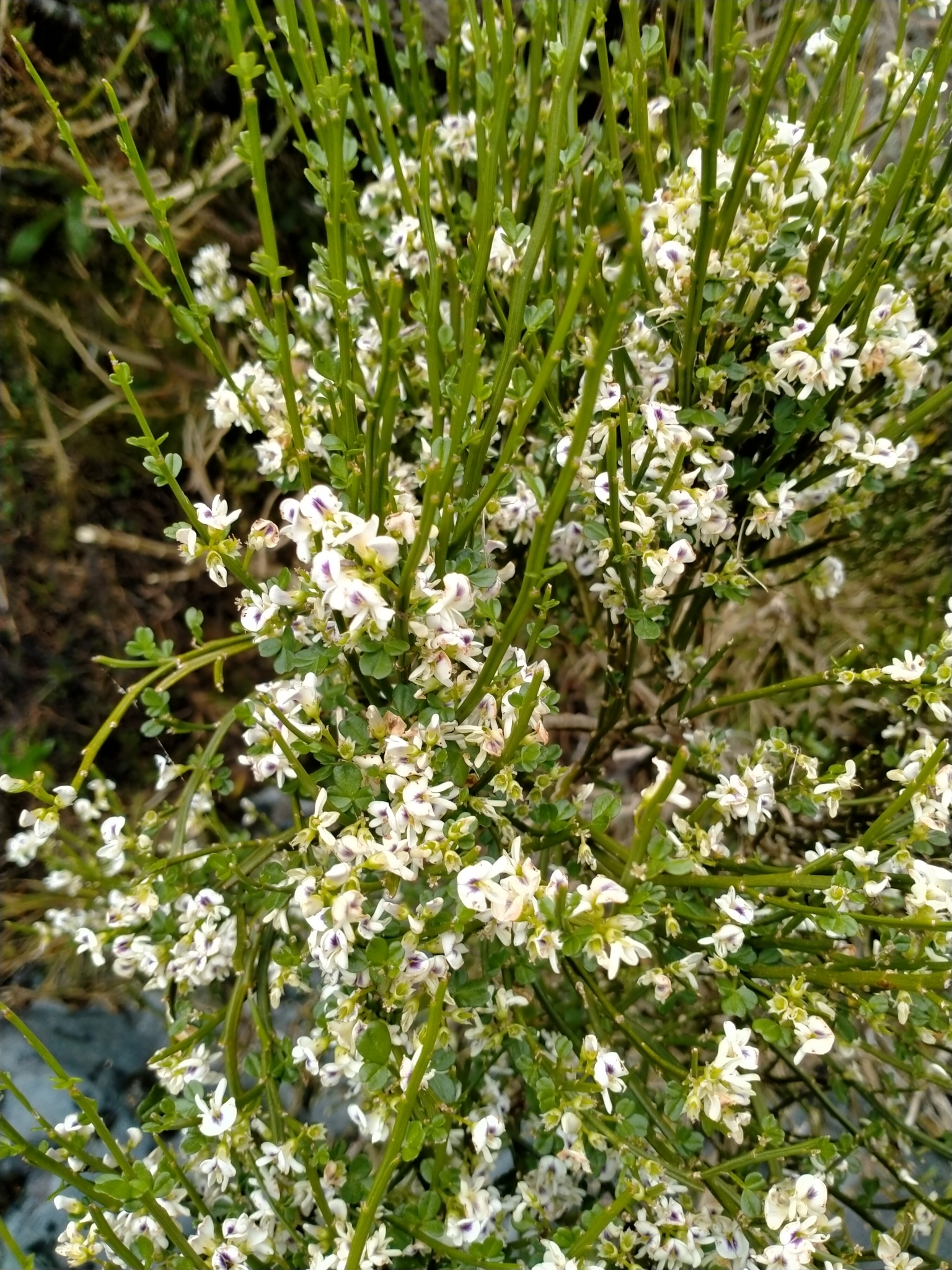
A species of Carmichaelia, a possible host of S. epistrota larvae.

This species inhabits open grass country and shrubland. Hudson stated in his book A supplement to the butterflies and moths of New Zealand that the larvae of S. epistrota on species of Carmichaelia at Clarence Bridge, near Kaikoura, in November. This larval host was confirmed by Brian Patrick in 1994.
