= C. juncea =

C. juncea may refer to:

- Canna juncea, a garden plant
- Carmichaelia juncea, a New Zealand broom
- Ceropegia juncea, a lantern flower
- Chionochloa juncea, a tussock grass
- Chondrilla juncea, a noxious weed
- Conostylis juncea, a perennial herb
- Coronilla juncea, a North African plant
- Crotalaria juncea, an Asian legume
