= Nahui =

Nahui may refer to:

- Nahui Olin, a Mexican painter, poet, and artist's model
- Nahui Ollin, a 16th century concept in Aztec/Mexica cosmology
- Alternanthera nahui, a species in the family Amaranthaceae
