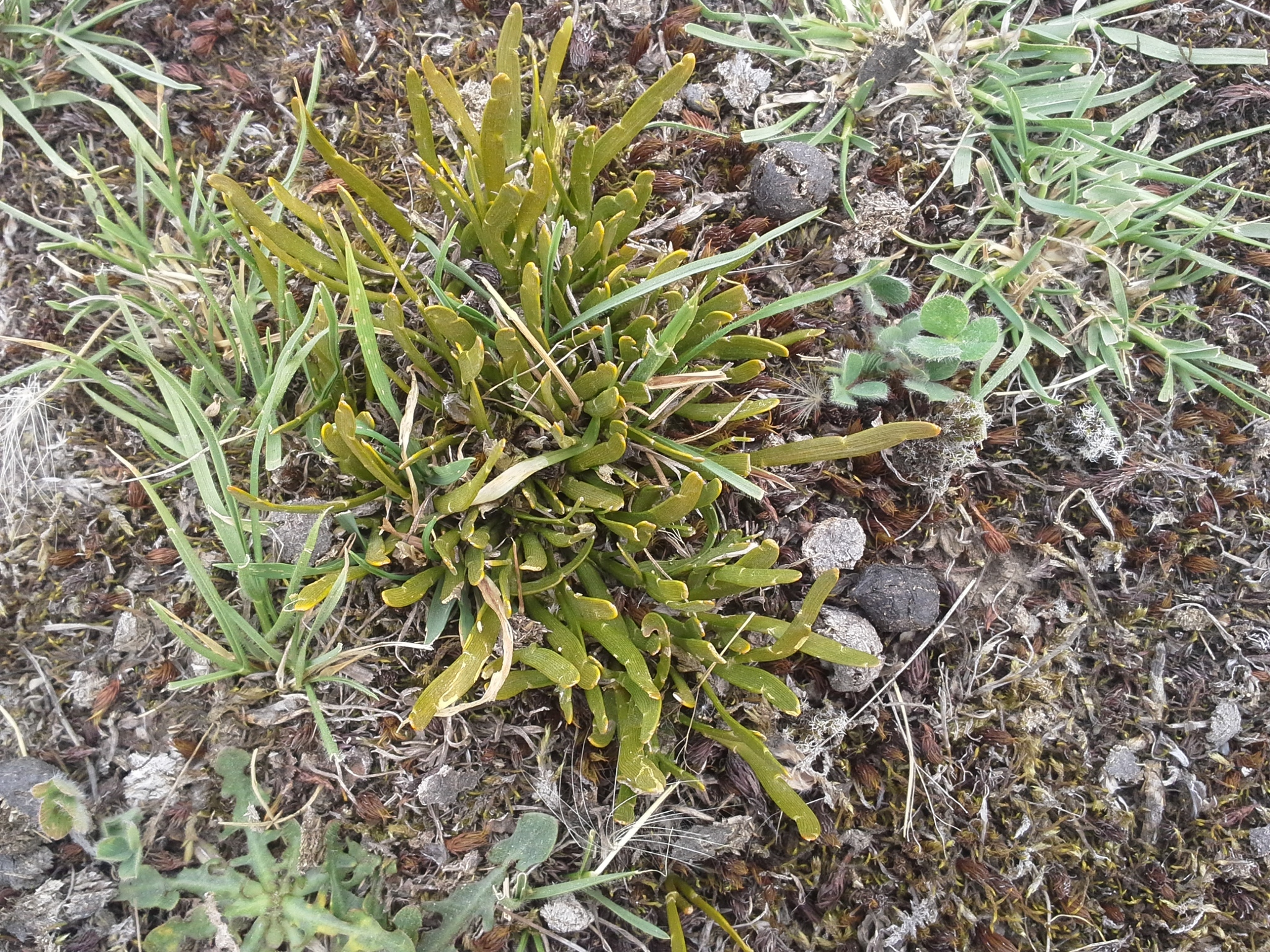

Conservation status
- Nationally Vulnerable (NZ TCS)

Scientific classification
- Kingdom: Plantae
- Clade: Tracheophytes
- Clade: Angiosperms
- Clade: Eudicots
- Clade: Rosids
- Order: Fabales
- Family: Fabaceae
- Subfamily: Faboideae
- Genus: Carmichaelia
- Species: C. corrugata

Binomial name
- Carmichaelia corrugata Colenso
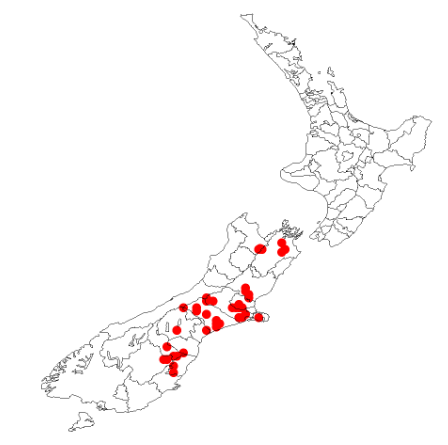
- Occurrence data from AVH

= Carmichaelia corrugata =

Species of legume

Carmichaelia corrugata (common name common dwarf broom) is a species of plant in the family Fabaceae. It is found only on the South Island of New Zealand.

== Description ==
Carmichaelia corrugata is a low growing (2–8 cm tall) leafless shrub consisting of yellow-green branches with blunt orange tips, forming a dense mat about 1 m wide. The branches are 1.5–3.5mm wide and grooved. The flowers are in pairs and are pink with a dark purple centre, and flowering occurs from October to May, with fruiting from November to June.

== Habitat ==
It is found on gravel and sand soils, stone and gravel ridges, river terraces, river beds, and disturbed sites.

== Taxonomy and naming ==
The species was first described by Colenso in 1883. The specific epithet, corrugata, is a Latin adjective meaning "wrinkled". There are no synonyms.

== Conservation status ==
In both 2004 and 2008, it was assessed as "Not Threatened". In 2012, it was found to be "At Risk - Declining", and by 2018 it was declared "Threatened - Nationally Vulnerable" under the New Zealand Threat Classification System.
