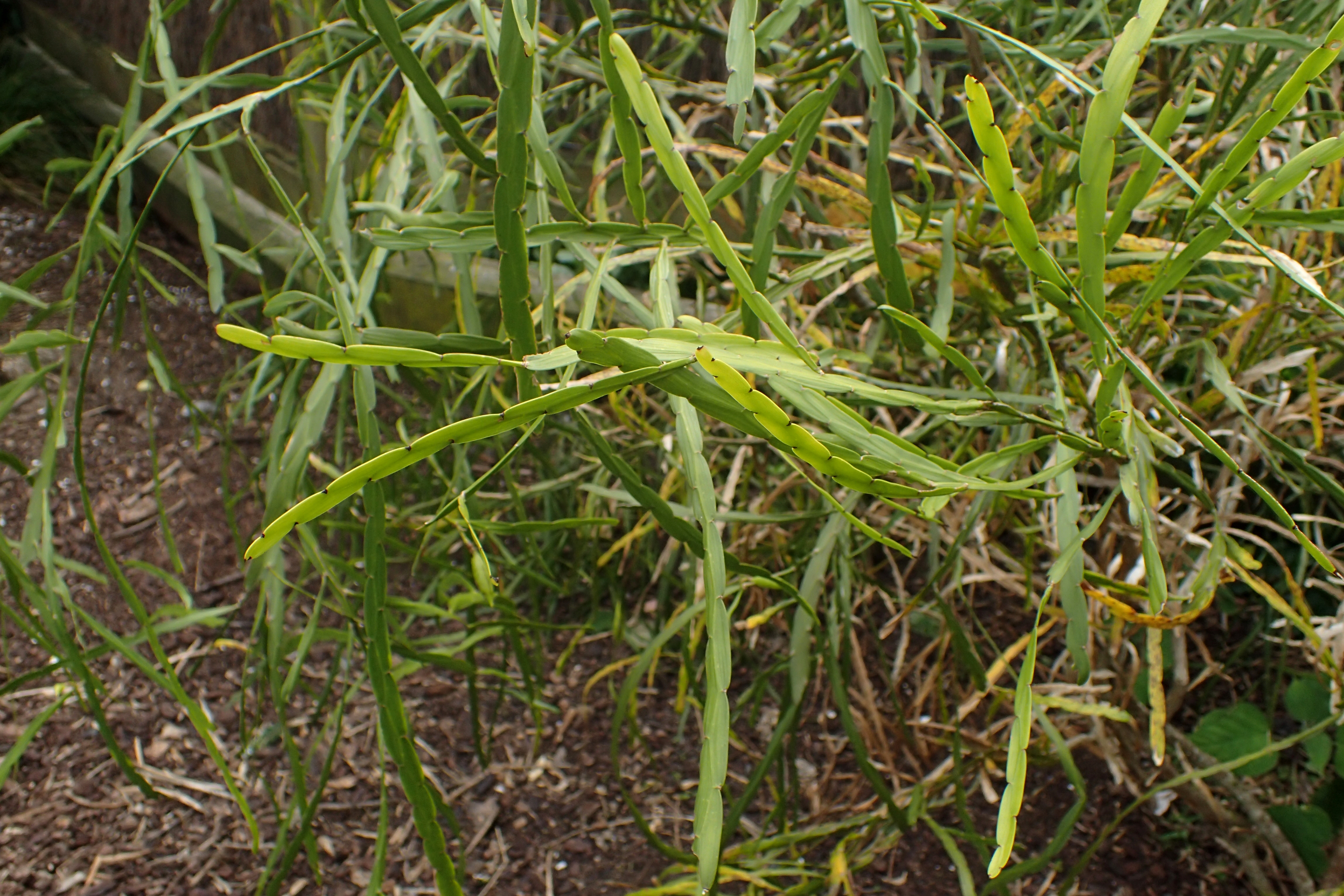

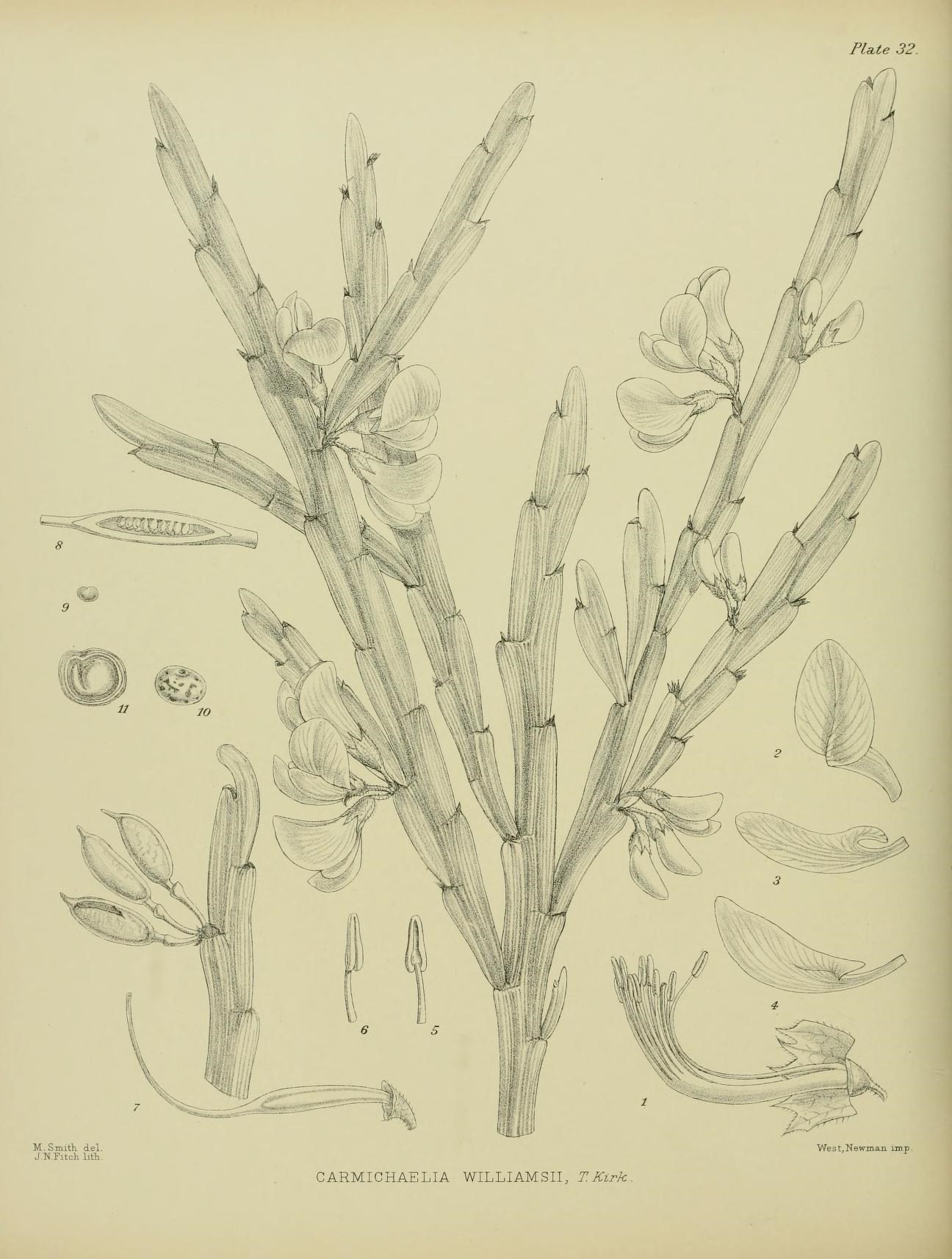
- (artist:Matilda Smith, 1914)

Conservation status
- Relict (NZ TCS)

Scientific classification
- Kingdom: Plantae
- Clade: Tracheophytes
- Clade: Angiosperms
- Clade: Eudicots
- Clade: Rosids
- Order: Fabales
- Family: Fabaceae
- Subfamily: Faboideae
- Genus: Carmichaelia
- Species: C. williamsii

Binomial name
- Carmichaelia williamsii Kirk
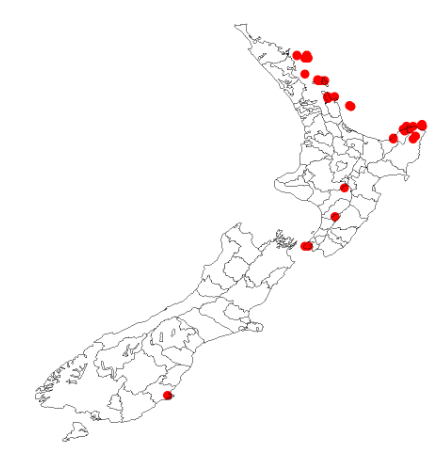
- Occurrence data from AVH

= Carmichaelia williamsii =

Species of legume

Carmichaelia williamsii (common name William's broom or giant-flowered broom) is a species of plant in the family Fabaceae. It is found only in the North Island of New Zealand. Its conservation status (2018) is "At Risk (relict)" under the New Zealand Threat Classification System.

== Description ==
Carmichaelia williamsii is the only yellow-flowered native broom, and it is distinguished from the introduced broom (Cytisus scoparius (L.) Link) by its light green, much wider, and more flattened branches, together with its larger, pale-yellow flowers which have purple or red veins, and its late-winter flowering (July to October, though flowering can occur throughout the year).

== Taxonomy ==
The species was first described by Thomas Kirk in 1880. The earliest record in AVH, SP026354 was collected by Bishop William Williams in 1879 somewhere in the North Island, and for whom Kirk named it.

== Habitat ==
It is a coastal species found in open forest, scrub, cliff faces and on scree.
