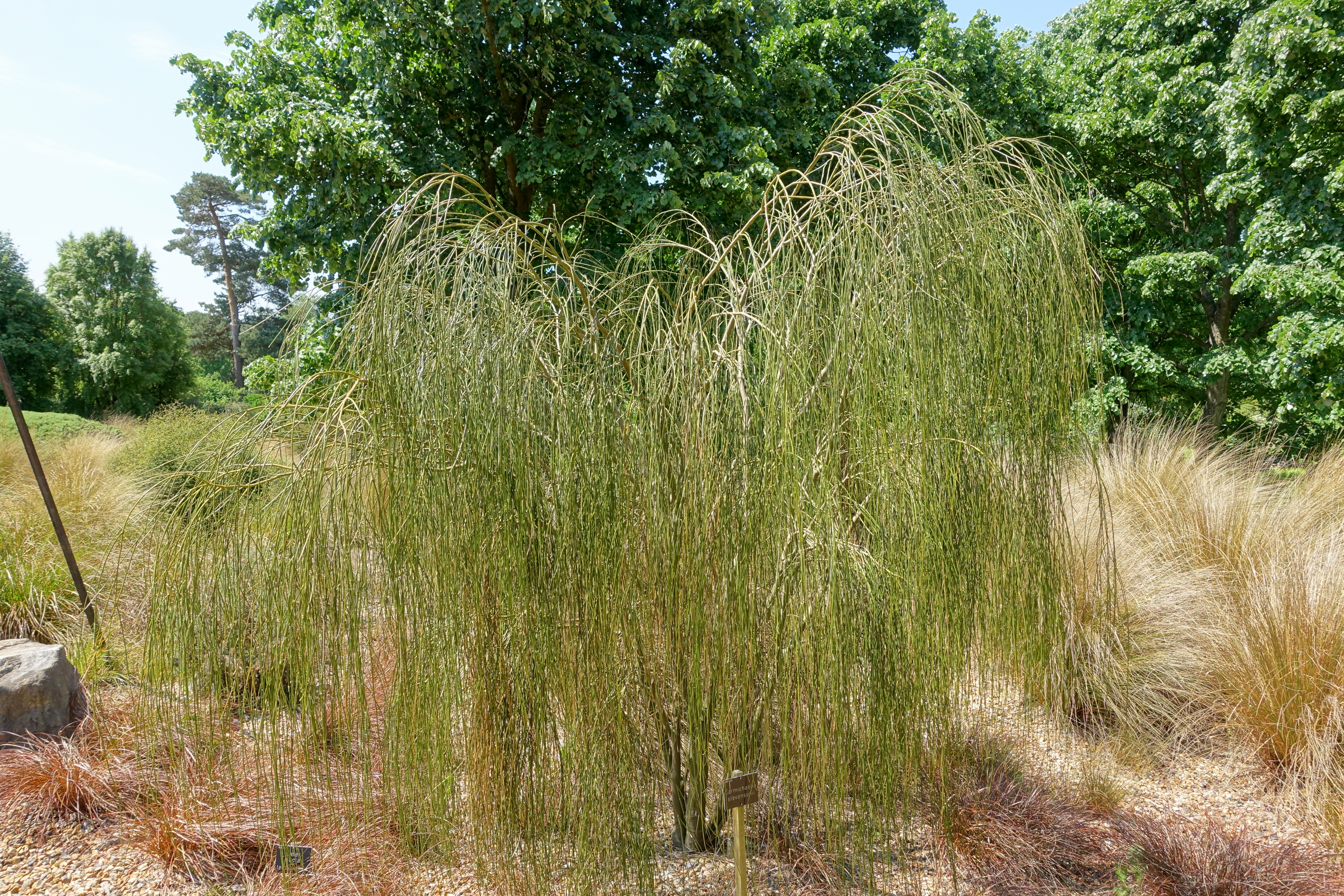

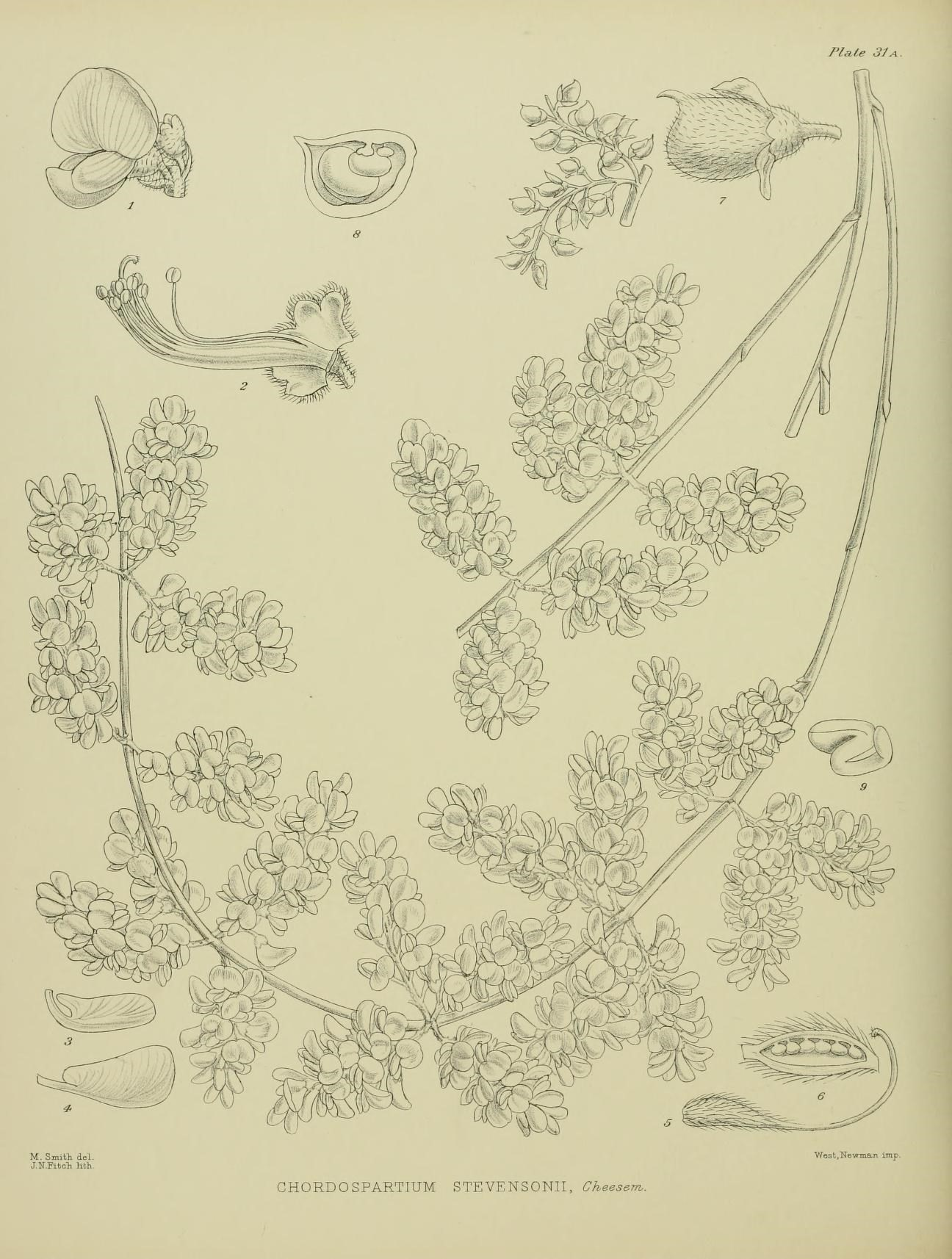

Conservation status
- Vulnerable (IUCN 2.3)

- Declining (NZ TCS)

Scientific classification
- Kingdom: Plantae
- Clade: Tracheophytes
- Clade: Angiosperms
- Clade: Eudicots
- Clade: Rosids
- Order: Fabales
- Family: Fabaceae
- Subfamily: Faboideae
- Genus: Carmichaelia
- Species: C. stevensonii

Binomial name
- Carmichaelia stevensonii (Cheeseman) Heenan
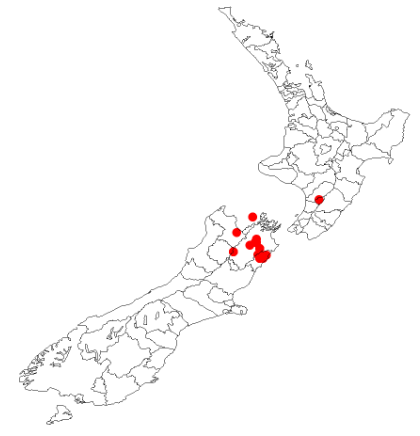
- Occurrence data from AVH

Synonyms
- Chordospartium stevensonii Cheeseman

= Carmichaelia stevensonii =

Species of legume

Carmichaelia stevensonii, the cord broom or weeping broom, is a species of shrubby plant in the family Fabaceae, endemic to the north east of the South Island of New Zealand. It is threatened by habitat loss. It is a leafless shrub up to 3.5 m (11 ft) height. Unlike Spanish broom, it has "weeping" (downward-bending) branches.

== Taxonomy ==
It was first described by Thomas Cheeseman in 1911 as Chordospartium stevensonii, but was reassigned to the genus, Carmichaelia, by Peter Brian Heenan in 1998.

== Conservation status ==
The IUCN redlist listed it as "Vulnerable" in 1998 due to habitat loss. Assessments under the New Zealand Threat Classification System (NZTCS), declared it to be "At Risk – Declining" (Dec) in 2018.
