= Carmichaelia juncea =

Conservation status
- Nationally Vulnerable (NZ TCS)

Scientific classification
- Kingdom: Plantae
- Clade: Tracheophytes
- Clade: Angiosperms
- Clade: Eudicots
- Clade: Rosids
- Order: Fabales
- Family: Fabaceae
- Subfamily: Faboideae
- Genus: Carmichaelia
- Species: C. juncea

Binomial name
- Carmichaelia juncea Hook.f.
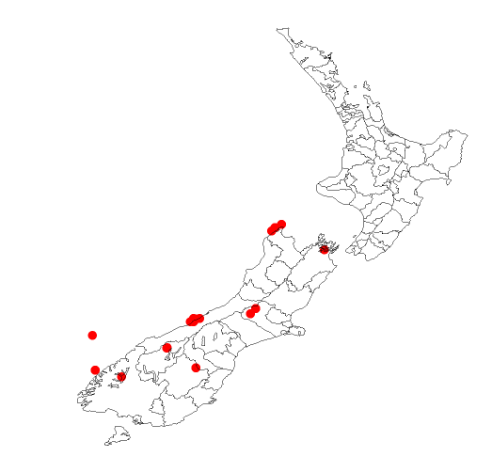
- Occurrence data from AVH

Species of legume

Carmichaelia juncea, the braided riverbed broom, is a species of New Zealand broom, a prostrate shrub in the family Fabaceae that is endemic to New Zealand. It is extinct over much of its former range, including the North Island.

== Discovery ==
Carmichaelia juncea was first identified botanically by the British explorer and botanist Sir Joseph Hooker. In 1839 he joined the Antarctic expedition led by Sir James Ross as assistant surgeon and naturalist on board the Erebus. During the southern winter of 1841 he spent three months based in the Bay of Islands collecting plants. Once he had returned to England he corresponded with many New Zealand plant collectors, encouraging them, sending news and advice and in return receiving specimens to add to his collection. His first book on New Zealand plants Flora Novae-Zelandiae was published in 1853.

Originally several species similar to Carmichaelia juncea were described. One of these species was found growing on lake shores along the east coast of the South Island. By 1993 (along with most other members of this group) it had not been seen or collected in over 50 years and was presumed extinct. Amazingly that year it was "re-discovered" growing in a rock garden at the Edinburgh Botanical Gardens. In 1995 this small group of Carmichaelia species were all combined as one species, C. juncea. The epithet juncea means 'rush-like' in Greek.

== Description ==
Carmichaelia juncea is a low growing prostrate shrub that forms a sprawling mat (20 cm (7.9 in) high and up to 1.5 m (4 ft 11 in) wide), looking very like a clump of dying rushes. The switch-like branchlets are light green to light brown, with very few leaves. The flowers are small and white with purple highlights. The seed pods are short and black, the seeds probably wind distributed. C. juncea flowers between October and January and fruits between November and March.

== Habitat and ecology ==
New Zealand has 23 Carmichaelia species and 14 are listed as threatened or at risk. C. juncea is generally found in rocky areas where there is little competition from other plants; along open river flats, on sandy or stony lake shores and also on exposed rocky outcrops along the coast. Surviving in these tough conditions makes it an excellent plant for rock gardens or for growing in containers. C. juncea was once widespread over both the North and South Island but was probably never very common because of its specific habitat requirements. It is now considered extinct in the North Island while in the South Island it is only found in two areas; Puponga in North-West Nelson and in a few locations in South Westland from Franz Josef to Haast. Like many New Zealand natives the survival of C. juncea is threatened by introduced mammals. At Franz Josef heavy browsing by hares has almost completely prevented seed production in mature plants. It is also under threat from habitat loss; in particular the modification of braided rivers and because of its prostrate habit, introduced weeds.

Carmichaelia juncea is most closely related to C. compacta and C. curta although it is easily distinguishable by its prostrate habit.
