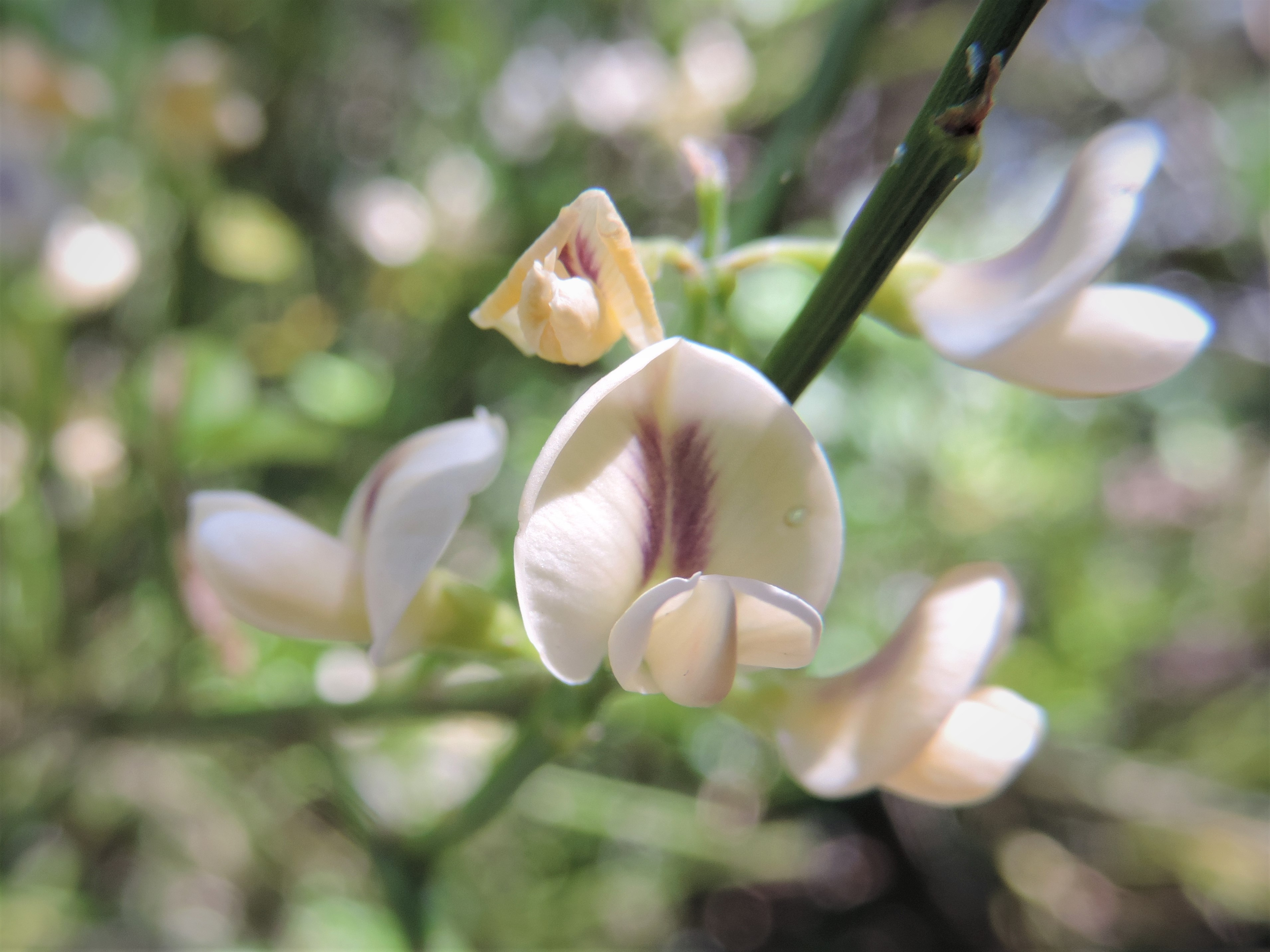

Scientific classification
- Kingdom: Plantae
- Clade: Tracheophytes
- Clade: Angiosperms
- Clade: Eudicots
- Clade: Rosids
- Order: Fabales
- Family: Fabaceae
- Subfamily: Faboideae
- Genus: Carmichaelia
- Species: C. exsul

Binomial name
- Carmichaelia exsul F.Muell. (1871)
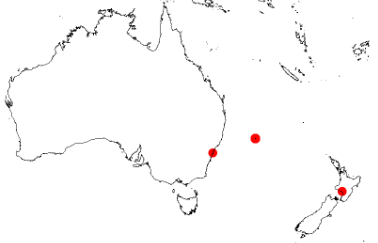
- Occurrence data from AVH

= Carmichaelia exsul =

Species of legume

Carmichaelia exsul is a flowering plant in the legume family. It is the only species of the genus Carmichaelia found in Australia. The specific epithet means an exile, with reference to it being the only species in its genus native outside New Zealand.

== Description ==
It is a broom-like shrub, growing to 1–3 m in height. The adult shoots are leafless, ridged, flattened, drooping and spreading. The flowers are white with purple markings, sweetly scented and produced in racemose inflorescences. The pale orange, kidney-shaped seeds are 3 mm long.

== Distribution and habitat ==
The plant is endemic to Australia’s subtropical Lord Howe Island in the Tasman Sea. It is a rare inhabitant of rock ledges in the island's southern mountains at elevations of over 400 m. The species is listed as endangered in New South Wales.
