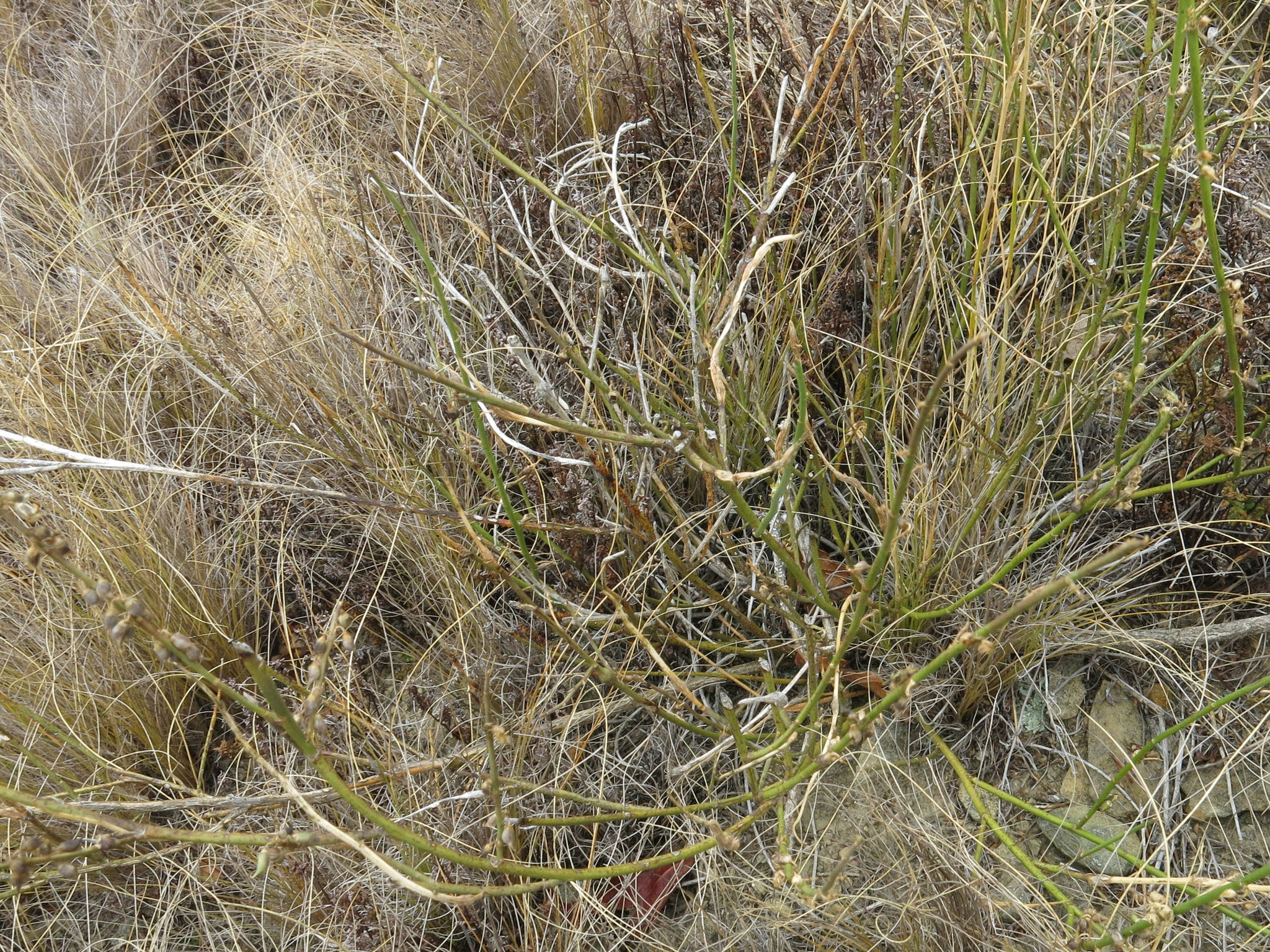

Conservation status
- Nationally Critical (NZ TCS)

Scientific classification
- Kingdom: Plantae
- Clade: Tracheophytes
- Clade: Angiosperms
- Clade: Eudicots
- Clade: Rosids
- Order: Fabales
- Family: Fabaceae
- Subfamily: Faboideae
- Genus: Carmichaelia
- Species: C. curta

Binomial name
- Carmichaelia curta (Petrie
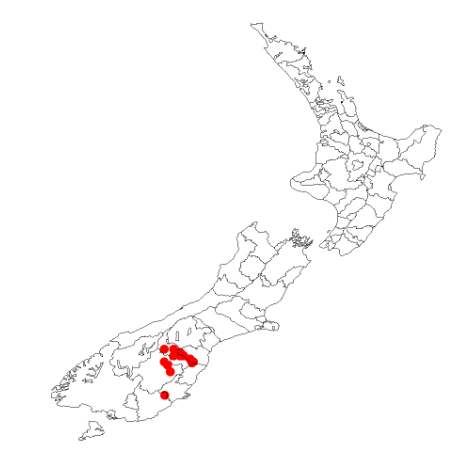
- Occurrence data from AVH

= Carmichaelia curta =

Species of plant

Carmichaelia curta is a species of plant in the family Fabaceae. It is found in New Zealand. It is classified as having the "Nationally Critical" conservation status under the New Zealand Threat Classification System.
