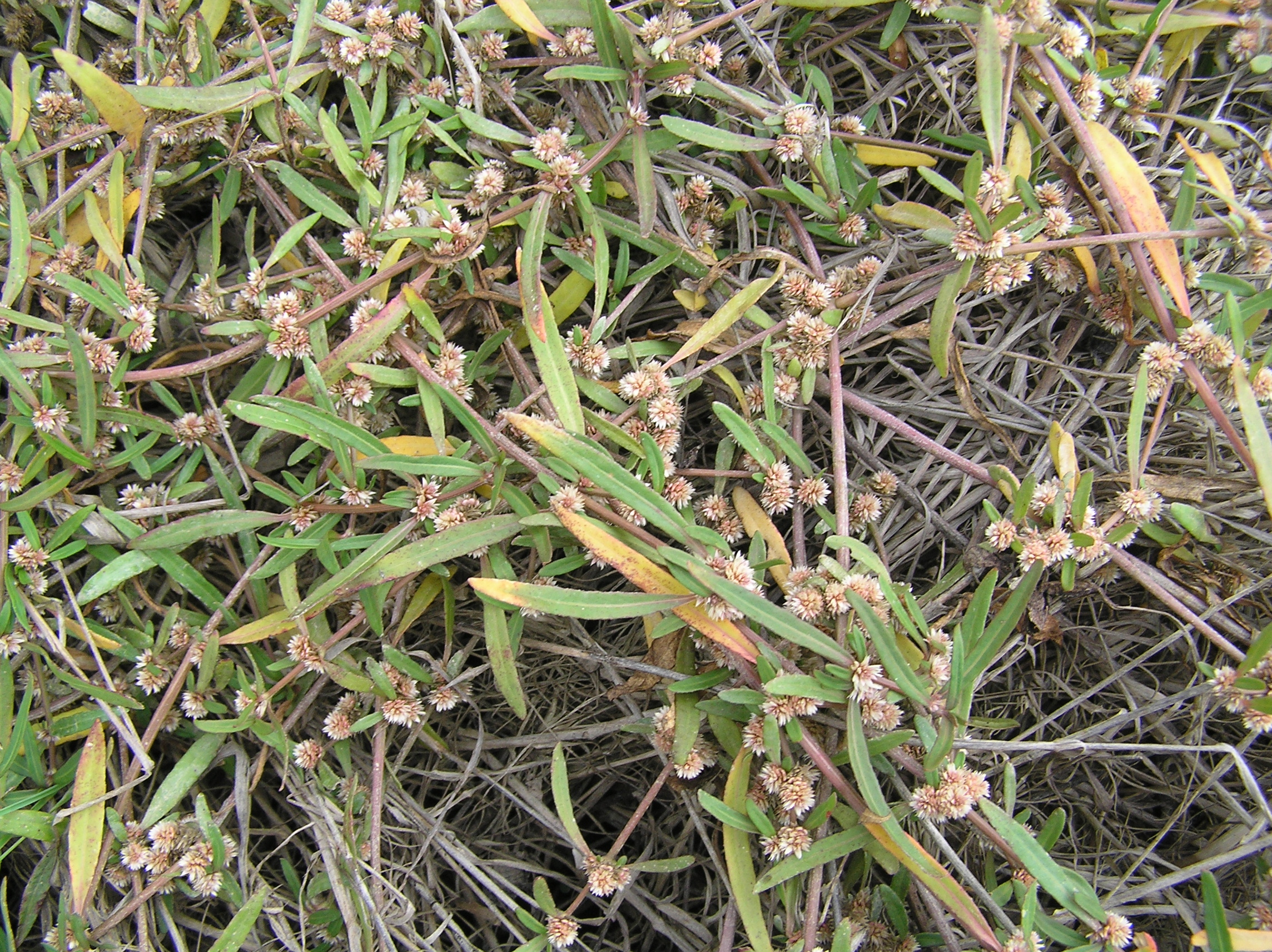
- Alternanthera nahui

Scientific classification
- Kingdom: Plantae
- Clade: Tracheophytes
- Clade: Angiosperms
- Clade: Eudicots
- Order: Caryophyllales
- Family: Amaranthaceae
- Genus: Alternanthera
- Species: A. nahui

Binomial name
- Alternanthera nahui Heenan & de Lange

= Alternanthera nahui =

Species of flowering plant

Alternanthera nahui, commonly known as nahui, is a species in the family Amaranthaceae, native to New Zealand and to Norfolk Island.

== Description ==
It is a perennial herb that has a slender tap root. Its stems are 1.5–3.0 mm in diameter and tend to lie down. It can be distinguished from Alternanthera sessilis by its narrower leaves, its keeled tepals, its shorter staminodes and style.

== Taxonomy ==
It was first described in 2009 by Peter Heenan, Peter de Lange and J. Keeling.

== Synonymy ==
There are no synonyms according to Plants of the World Online. However, according to NZPCN it has, from time to time, been incorrectly referred as Alternanthera sessilis (L.) Roem. & Schult, prior to the species description in 2009.

== Habitat ==
It is a coastal and lowland species found in both seasonally and permanently wet habitats.

== Conservation status ==
In the 2018 conservation assessment of de Lange and others under the New Zealand Threat Classification System it was classed as "Not Threatened", having a "large, stable population".
