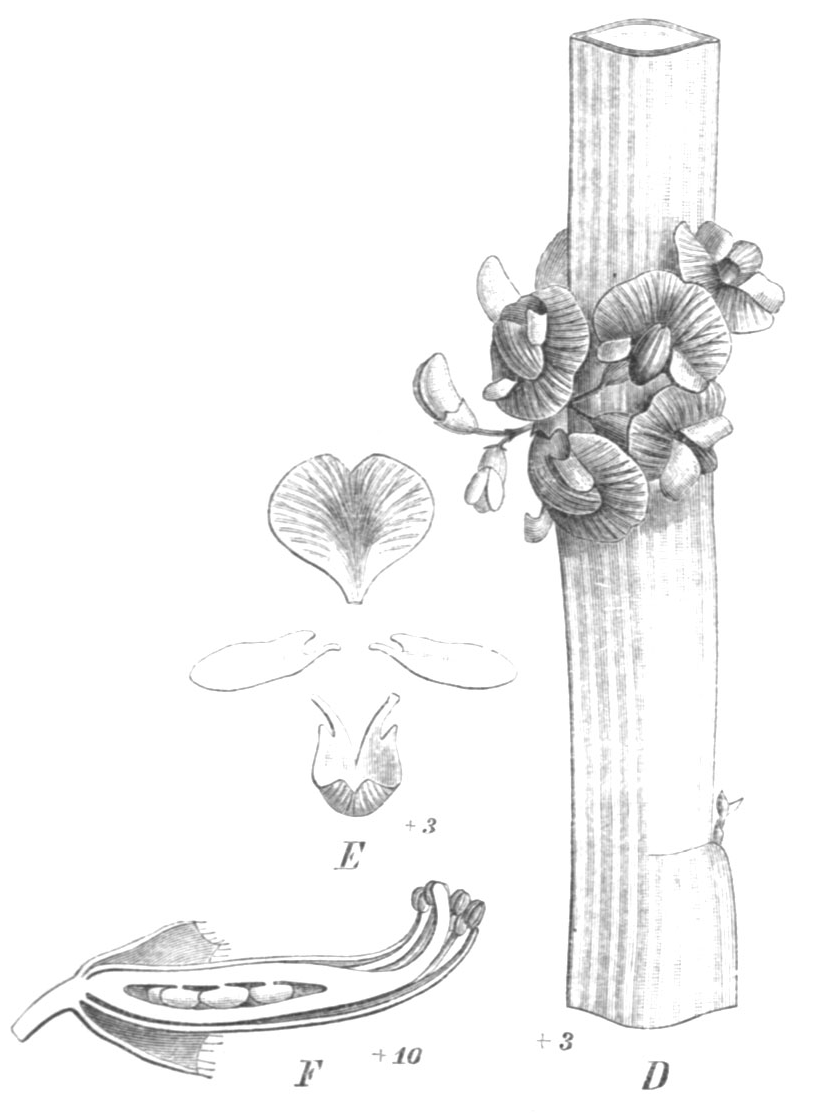
- Illustration by Taubert (1891)

Conservation status
- Least Concern (IUCN 3.1)

- Not Threatened (NZ TCS)

Scientific classification
- Kingdom: Plantae
- Clade: Tracheophytes
- Clade: Angiosperms
- Clade: Eudicots
- Clade: Rosids
- Order: Fabales
- Family: Fabaceae
- Subfamily: Faboideae
- Genus: Carmichaelia
- Species: C. australis

Binomial name
- Carmichaelia australis R.Br.
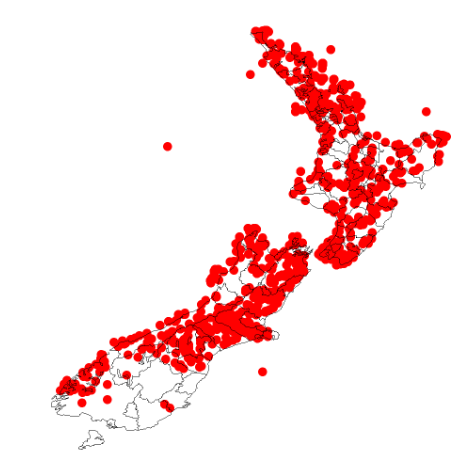
- Occurrence data from AVH

Synonyms
- Carmichaelia acuminata Kirk; Carmichaelia aligera G.Simpson; Carmichaelia arenaria G.Simpson; Carmichaelia corymbosa Colenso; Carmichaelia cunninghamii Raoul; Carmichaelia egmontiana (Cockayne & Allan) G.Simpson; Carmichaelia flagelliformis Colenso; Carmichaelia hookeri Kirk; Carmichaelia micrantha Colenso; Carmichaelia muelleriana Regel; Carmichaelia multicaulis Colenso; Carmichaelia ovata G.Simpson; Carmichaelia paludosa Cockayne; Carmichaelia rivulata G.Simpson; Carmichaelia robusta Kirk; Carmichaelia silvatica G.Simpson; Carmichaelia solandri G.Simpson; Carmichaelia stricta Lehm. Carmichaelia subulata Kirk; Carmichaelia violacea Kirk; Genista compressa Sol. ex A.Cunn.

= Carmichaelia australis =

Species of legume

Carmichaelia australis, commonly known as the New Zealand common broom or mākaka, is a shrub of the Fabaceae family. It is native to New Zealand and found in both the North and South Islands.

Image of whole common broom plant showing distinctive leaves

== Description ==
New Zealand broom is a rapidly spreading and ascending shrub typically growing between 2-8 x 2–5 meters. Carmichaelia australis has distinguishing morphological structures allowing for easy identification due to the design of its stems, its flowers and colour formations. Its flattened photosynthetic cladode stems take in sunlight, and this plant has no need for leaves. However, three to five foliates can sometimes be present on seedlings and young plants. If leaves are present, they are vibrant green compound leaflets and at times have dark spots. Both the leaves and stems have smooth surfaces with minimal hairs. Each of the leaflets has a notch at the apex (tip of leaflet) which is emarginate.

The floral arrangement of C. australis on the main stem is raceme, with one to three of these short stalks per node, with each stalk having five to eight flowers. The outer floral green leaves on each flower are often bell shaped and triangular being pressed up against the middle flower petals. Flowers are often very small, having a white pigment and purple veins. Pollen and reproductive structures of the flowers of C. australis at the core with the stamens (male fertilizing organ) being 3–4 mm long and the pistil being 4 mm long (female fertilizing organ). The New Zealand broom pods are oblong shaped with a grey, brown or black external appearance. These pods split open when mature to release seeds. In each pod there is between one and three seeds. These seeds are oblong, or bean shaped and vary in colour between orange, red and green, sometimes with black mottling.

The species was first described by Robert Brown in 1825. The specific epithet, australis, means "southern". The earliest collected specimen was collected by Joseph Banks and Daniel Solander in 1769 (AK102896) and is held in Auckland Museum.

== Range ==
The species in the genus Carmichaelia have originated from a single common ancestor. The records suggest this common ancestor dispersed from Australia about five million years ago. The present geographical distribution of Carmichaelia species indicates the common ancestor must have been on the landmass that broke away to form New Zealand. This is because the Carmichaelia genus has only developed in New Zealand; the 23 known species of Carmichaelia are all endemic to New Zealand, except for Carmichaelia exsul which is endemic to Lord Howe Island located off the coast of Australia. Carmichaelia australis is one of these species that is endemic to New Zealand.

Carmichaelia australis is widely naturally distributed across New Zealand's two main islands, the North Island and South Island; however, this species will not grow in the southern South Island. Carmichaelia australis has lots of localised populations across both the North Island and South Island, due to the way its seeds disperse. When C. australis seed pods burst, they travel small distances, sprouting in nearby soil, compared to seeds which are wind and bird dispersed which have less localised populations.

== Habitat ==
Carmichaelia australis occupies a vast range of habitats in New Zealand with a broad realised niche. The optimal habitats for growth are coastlines, low-lying areas, montane river terraces, riverbanks, colluvium inclines, throughout tussock grasslands, on thick bush edges, around swamps and amidst rock outcrops.Carmichaelia australis typically occurs in most habitats except on cliff faces and poor pioneer land.

== Life cycle/phenology ==
Information on Carmichaelia australis phenology is limited, with research still needing to be undertaken. Carmichaelia australis seed germination occurs within one to three weeks of the seeds dispersing. Carmichaelia australis can take up to a year after germination to reach adult reproductive maturity. These adult stems emerge typically leafless from above the cotyledons (first leave produce by plants) at the base of the juvenile stems. The timing of flowering in this species is typically between October and February annually, and fruiting also occurs annually between November and May. The duration of seed viability before dormancy has not been determined. Studies need to be conducted to find out this information about their seed banks. The timing of these events for Carmichaelia australis will vary due to environmental or geological conditions.

== Diet and foraging ==
Carmichaelia australis grows best in shallow soil/ topsoil up to a depth of 25 cm. This species has a vast range of environmental tolerances. Carmichaelia australis has very low capacity to withstand salt spray on leaflets and stems. Broom can tolerate wind, and it will not be affected by wind burning. It is a very drought tolerant species which can undertake prolonged periods of no rain or irrigation. Carmichaelia australis is temperature hardy, tolerating up to –7 °C. Carmichaelia australis roots cannot tolerate waterlogging for several days in a row. If C. australis is impacted by these low tolerances, the shrub will respond by not growing and could eventually die.

== Predators, parasites and diseases ==
Carmichaelia australis interacts with a vast range of organisms that feed or live on this shrub. These organisms which interact with Carmichaelia australis are mites, beetles, aphids, moths and butterflies, flies, sucking bugs, and bees. Mites use Carmichaelia australis as a host plant; they interact with the shrub through consuming it and forming webbing between branches. Beetles live under the dead bark on this shrub, where they produce their larvae. Megaoura stufkensi is a newly discovered species of aphid that uses C. australis as a host plant, feeding on the shrub's young growth. This species of aphid is the only native species of the Macrcosiphini family in New Zealand. Butterflies and moths lay eggs on this species and their caterpillars feed on the shrub's leaves. Flies can create larvae under the leaves of this species and sucking bugs also feed on this shrub. Lastly, this shrub is a nectar source for honeybees when the flowers are in blossom.

== Species uses and limits ==
The endemic shrub Carmichaelia australis has multiple uses and limits in New Zealand's natural ecosystem. It is a nitrogen fixing species, it can be outcompeted and it has cultural association. The Carmichaelia genus is a member of the Fabaceae family which are nitrogen fixing plants. The roots of C. australis have a symbiotic relationship with the Rhizobia bacteria. This relationship allows for this shrub to take in nitrogen from the atmosphere and store the nitrogen in the shrub's root nodules for the Rhizobia bacteria to share nitrogen around the soil, ultimately increasing soil fertility.

Competition can be a significant problem for Carmichaelia australis, which has not adapted to outcompete weed species, meaning it will likely be suppressed by weeds, when weeds are in large abundances.

Māori are the tangata whenua of New Zealand. The values encompass the idea that people are integrated with the ecosystem, with Māori being part of the ecosystem not a separate entity. This integrated approach is expressed within the Māori linguistics of the New Zealand fauna and flora, with the endemic Carmichaelia australis being compared to a human. In the Māori culture, this species is referred to having no heart and a bad man is compared to it – E rito koe ki te taunoka. This interpretation indicates the tangata whenua's perception of this species must have been negative, to develop this meaning associated with the species. This translation of this species emphasizes that the relationship between flora and fauna and tangata whenua is not always positive.

== Synonymy ==
Carmichaelia solandri G.Simpson is accepted as a different species by ILDIS, but not by Plants of the World Online, nor by Allan (1961), nor Heenan (1996). (Heenan's extensive list of synonyms differs from that of Plants of the World Online.) See also: NZFlora Carmichaelia australis.

== Gallery ==
Closer of leaves

Plant with flowers

Close up of flowers
