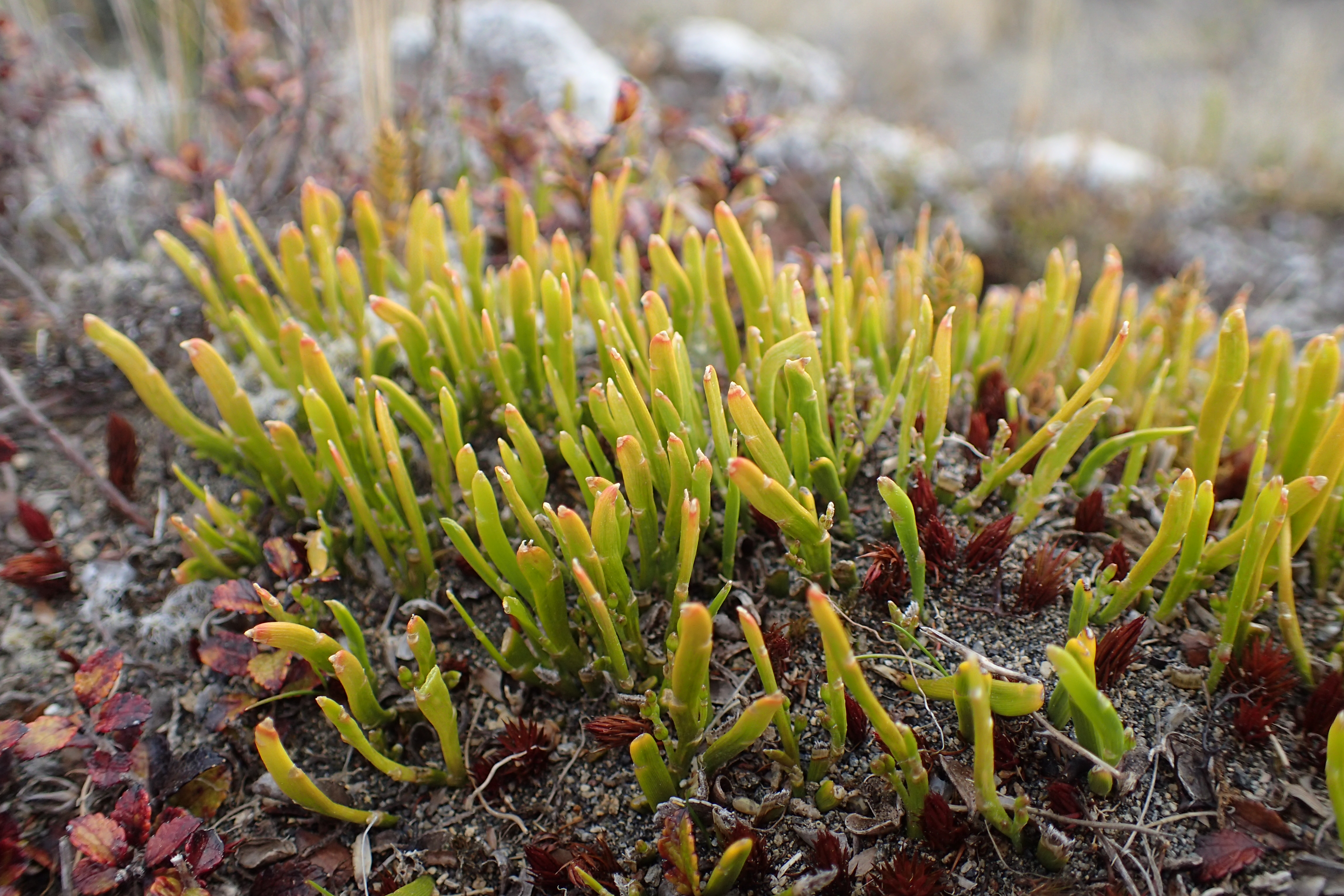
- Rangipo Desert, Waikato

Conservation status
- Nationally Vulnerable (NZ TCS)

Scientific classification
- Kingdom: Plantae
- Clade: Tracheophytes
- Clade: Angiosperms
- Clade: Eudicots
- Clade: Rosids
- Order: Fabales
- Family: Fabaceae
- Subfamily: Faboideae
- Genus: Carmichaelia
- Species: C. nana

Binomial name
- Carmichaelia nana (Benth.) Colenso ex Hook.f.
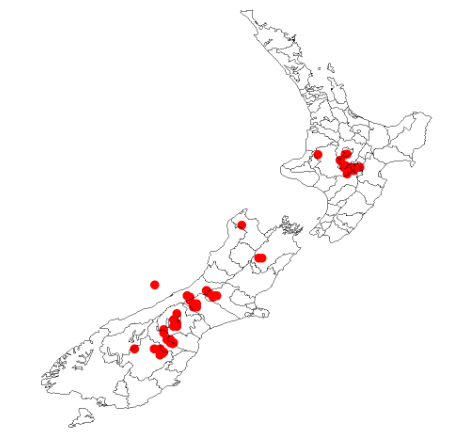
- Occurrence data from AVH

Synonyms
- Carmichaelia enysii Kirk; Carmichaelia orbiculata Colenso

= Carmichaelia nana =

Species of legume

Carmichaelia nana is a species of plant in the family Fabaceae. It is found in both the North and South Islands of New Zealand. Its conservation status in 2013 was assessed as "At Risk (declinining)" under the New Zealand Threat Classification System, but in 2018 its risk under the same system became "Threatened-Nationally Vulnerable".

== Description ==
Carmichaelia nana is a dwarf, spreading shrub growing in a dense mat from 20 to 60 mm high and 0.5 m wide.

== Taxonomy ==
The species was first described by George Bentham as C. australis var. β nana. It was raised to species level by William Colenso in 1864 in Joseph Dalton Hooker's "Handbook of New Zealand Flora". The specific epithet, nana, is a Latin adjective meaning "diminutive" or "dwarfed".

== Habitat ==
It is found from both lowland to alpine habitats in alluvial river beds, terraces, and moraines.
