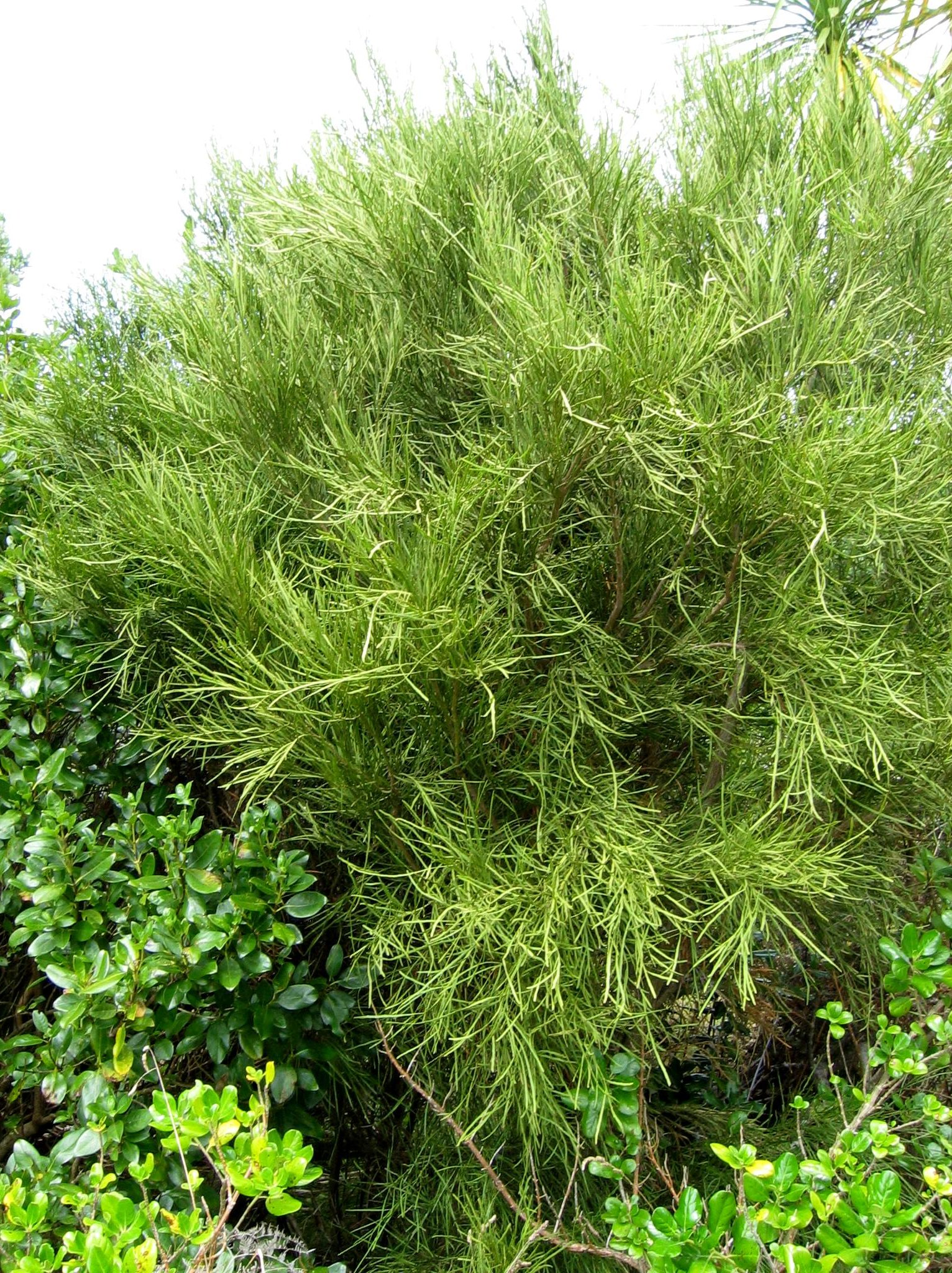
- North Island broom, Carmichaelia aligera

Scientific classification
- Kingdom: Plantae
- Clade: Tracheophytes
- Clade: Angiosperms
- Clade: Eudicots
- Clade: Rosids
- Order: Fabales
- Family: Fabaceae
- Subfamily: Faboideae
- Clade: Inverted repeat-lacking clade
- Tribe: Galegeae
- Subtribe: Astragalinae
- Genus: Carmichaelia; R.Br.

Type species
- Carmichaelia australis

Synonyms
- ×Carmispartium M.D.Griffiths; Chordospartium Cheeseman; Corallospartium J.B.Armstr.; Huttonella Kirk; Notospartium Hook.f.

= Carmichaelia =

New Zealand broom

Genus of legumes

Carmichaelia (New Zealand brooms) is a genus of 24 plant species belonging to Fabaceae, the legume family. All but one species are native to New Zealand; the exception, Carmichaelia exsul, is native to Lord Howe Island and presumably dispersed there from New Zealand.

The formerly recognised genera Chordospartium, Corallospartium, Notospartium and Huttonella are now all included in Carmichaelia. The genera Carmichaelia, Clianthus (kakabeak), Montigena (scree pea) and Swainsona comprise the clade Carmichaelinae. Carmichaelia is named after Captain Dugald Carmichael, a Scottish army officer and botanist who studied New Zealand plants.

Carmichaelia ranges in form from trees to prostrate species a few centimetres high. Mature plants are usually leafless, their leaves replaced by stipules which have fused into scales.

Carmichaelia species are found throughout New Zealand, although the eastern South Island has 15 species endemic to it. Most species have a restricted range within New Zealand. They colonise disturbed ground in shallow, poor soils, drought- and frost-prone areas, and alluvial soils.

The New Zealand brooms are not closely related to the European common broom Cytisus scoparius. Common broom has been introduced to New Zealand, where it is sometimes known as Scotch broom to distinguish it from native species and is classed as a noxious weed because of its invasiveness.

== Species ==
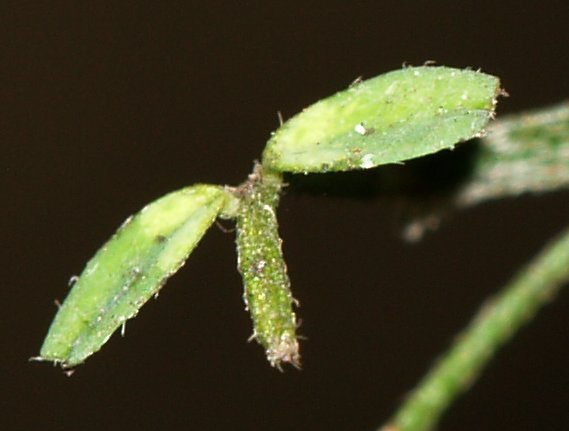
C. arborea leaves

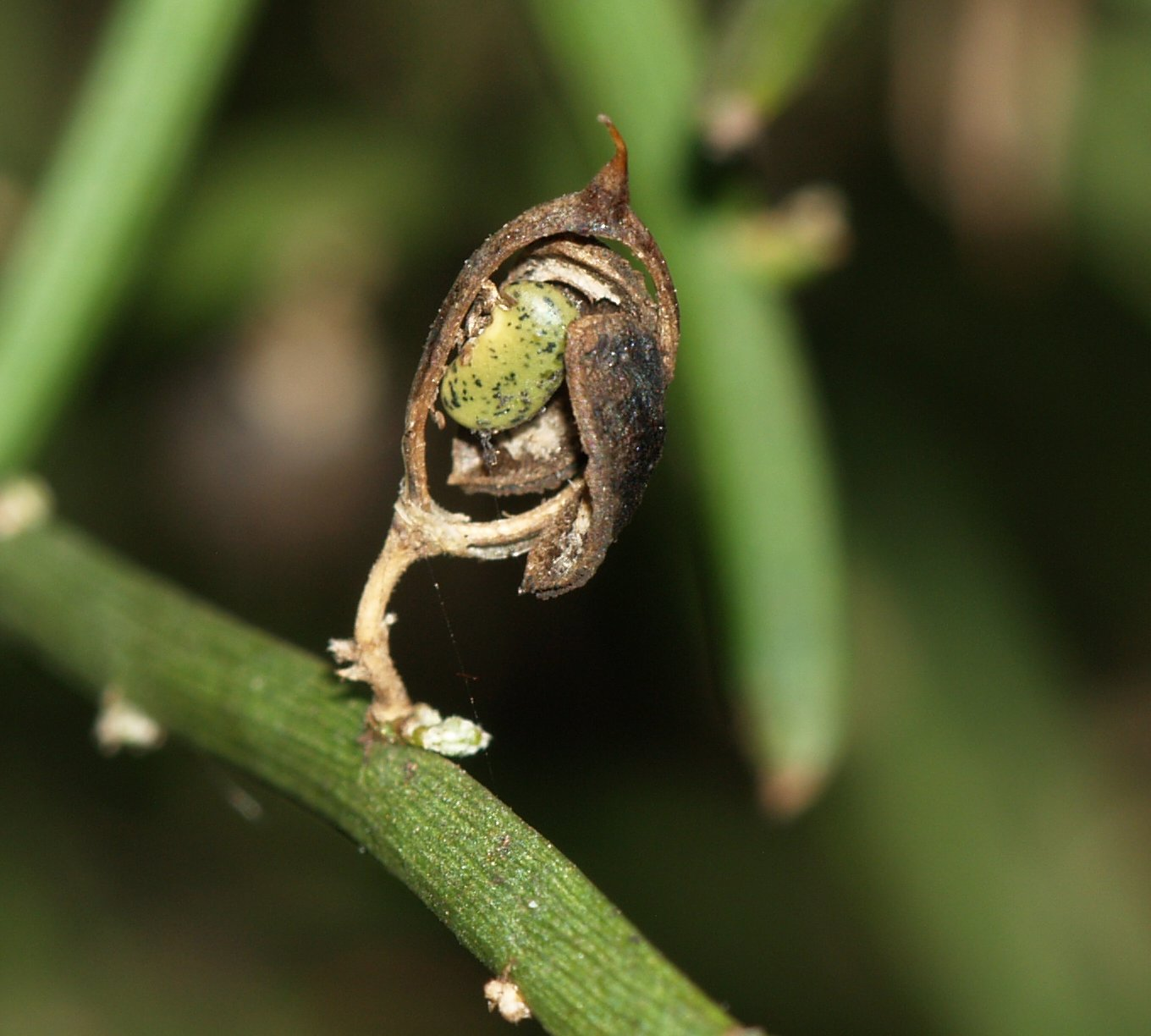
C. arborea fruit

Carmichaelia includes the following species:

- Carmichaelia aligera G. Simpson – North Island broom; common throughout the northern part of the North Island.
- Carmichaelia angustata Kirk – leafy broom
- Carmichaelia appressa G.Simpson
- Carmichaelia arborea (G.Forst.) Druce – South Island broom
- Carmichaelia arenaria G. Simpson
- Carmichaelia astonii G.Simpson
- Carmichaelia australis R.Br.
- Carmichaelia carmichaeliae (Hook.f.) Heenan
- Carmichaelia compacta Petrie
- Carmichaelia corrugata Colenso
- Carmichaelia crassicaulis Hook.f. – coral broom; occurs in arid, stony ground on the eastern side of the Southern Alps, growing up to an altitude of 1300 m.
- Carmichaelia cunninghamii Raoul
- Carmichaelia curta Petrie
- Carmichaelia egmontiana (Cockayne & Allan) G. Simpson
- Carmichaelia enysii – dwarf broom; forms low clumps not more than a few centimetres high. Found south of Arthur's Pass. (Both NZPCN and Plants of the World Online treat it as a synonym of C. nana.)
- Carmichaelia exsul F.Muell
- Carmichaelia fieldii Cockayne (Treated as synonym of C. juncea by Plants of the World Online.)
- Carmichaelia flagelliformis Hook. – whip broom; the stems are rounded, thin and whippy. Found from the East Cape southwards.
- Carmichaelia floribunda G. Simpson
- Carmichaelia glabrata G. Simpson
- Carmichaelia glabrescens (Petrie) Heenan – pink broom; grows up to 10 m high. It is restricted to growing at altitude in the Marlborough region of the South Island.
- Carmichaelia grandiflora – large-flowered broom; found only on the West Coast of the South Island.
- Carmichaelia hollowayi G.Simpson
- Carmichaelia hookeri Kirk
- Carmichaelia × hutchinsii (M.D.Griffiths) Heenan
- Carmichaelia juncea Hook.f.
- Carmichaelia kirkii Hook.f.
- Carmichaelia lacustris G. Simpson
- Carmichaelia monroi Hook.f.
- Carmichaelia muritai (A.W.Purdie) Heenan
- Carmichaelia nana (Hook.f.) Hook.f.
- Carmichaelia nigrans G. Simpson
- Carmichaelia odorata Benth. – scented broom
- Carmichaelia orbiculata Colenso
- Carmichaelia ovata G. Simpson
- Carmichaelia petriei Kirk
- Carmichaelia prona Kirk
- Carmichaelia ramosa G. Simpson
- Carmichaelia rivulata G. Simpson
- Carmichaelia robusta Kirk
- Carmichaelia silvatica G. Simpson
- Carmichaelia solandri G. Simpson
- Carmichaelia stevensonii (Cheeseman) Heenan – weeping broom, tree broom; a distinctive tree, growing up to 9 m high. It occurs only at altitude in the northeast corner of the South Island, particularly along the Waiau Toa / Clarence River and the Awatere River.
- Carmichaelia suteri Colenso
- Carmichaelia torulosa (Kirk) Heenan
- Carmichaelia uniflora Kirk
- Carmichaelia uniflora Kirk
- Carmichaelia violacea Kirk
- Carmichaelia virgata Kirk (Synonym of C. petriei Kirk according to Plants of the World Online)
- Carmichaelia williamsii Kirk – giant-flowered broom; found in coastal regions of the Bay of Plenty and East Cape.
- Carmichaelia vexillata Heenan
