= Peter Brian Heenan =

New Zealand botanist

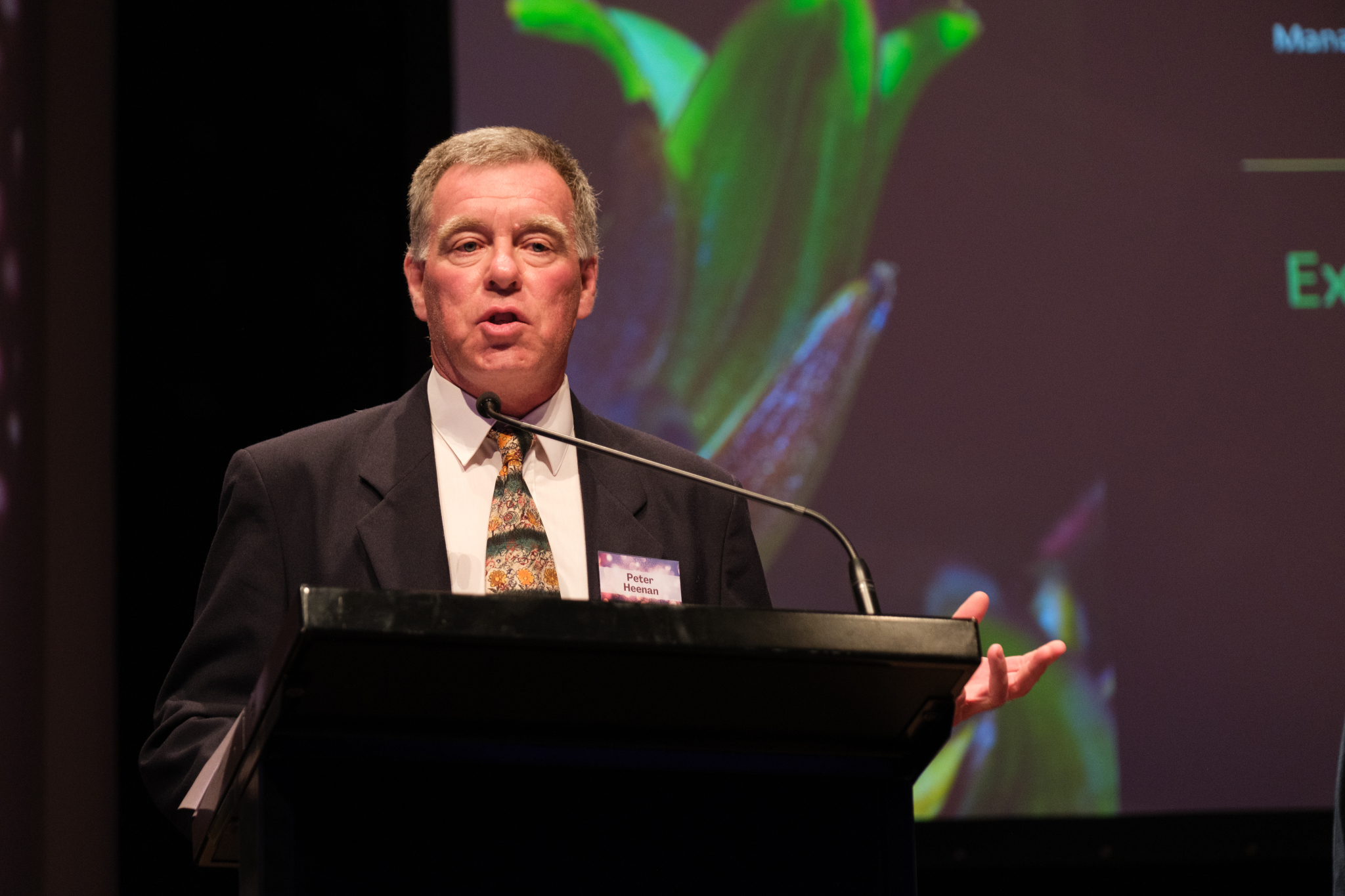
- Born: 1961 (age 64–65)
- Education: University of Canterbury
- Scientific career
- Fields: Botany
- Workplaces: Manaaki Whenua – Landcare Research
- Thesis: Systematics and evolution of Carmichaelia, Chordospartium, Corallospartium, and Notospartium (Fabaceae) from New Zealand (2000)
- Author abbrev. (botany): Heenan

Peter Brian Heenan (born 1961) is a New Zealand botanist.

Heenan has a 1984 diploma from Lincoln University, and graduated from the University of Canterbury with a PhD in 2000. In 2024, Heenan was awarded the Leonard Cockayne Memorial Lecture by the Royal Society Te Apārangi for "his decades-long commitment to Aotearoa New Zealand’s rich botany and sharing his knowledge with audiences across the country and the world".

The standard author abbreviation Heenan is used to indicate this person as the author when citing a botanical name.

== Names published ==
(incomplete list - 193 names published)

- Alternanthera nahui Heenan & de Lange, New Zealand J. Bot. 47(1): 102 (99–104; figs. 2B, 3C, 4B) (2009).
- Arthropodium bifurcatum Heenan, A.D.Mitch. & de Lange, New Zealand J. Bot. 42(2): 239 (−242; fig. 7) (2004).
- Brachyscome lucens Molloy & Heenan, Phytotaxa 415(1): 35 (2019).

(These may not all be accepted names.)

See also Taxa named by Peter Brian Heenan.

== Selected publications ==
- Heenan, Peter B.; McGlone, Matt S. (20 June 2019). "Cenozoic formation and colonisation history of the New Zealand vascular flora based on molecular clock dating of the plastidrbcLgene". New Zealand Journal of Botany. 57 (4): 204–226. doi:10.1080/0028825x.2019.1632356. ISSN 0028-825X. Wikidata Q104881037.
- Peter B. Heenan (24 July 2019). "Taxonomic notes on the New Zealand flora: the status of the extinct herb Stellaria elatinoides (Caryophyllaceae) and recognition of Stellaria multiflora subsp. multiflora from New Zealand". New Zealand Journal of Botany. 57 (4): 309–315. doi:10.1080/0028825x.2019.1645705. ISSN 0028-825X. Wikidata Q104880991.
- Peter B. Heenan (22 May 2019). "Taxonomic Notes on the New Zealand flora: Brachyscome simplicifolia J.B.Armstr. is a heterotypic synonym of Abrotanella linearis Berggr. (Asteraceae)". New Zealand Journal of Botany. 57 (3): 188–192. doi:10.1080/0028825x.2019.1619596. ISSN 0028-825X. Wikidata Q104880922.
