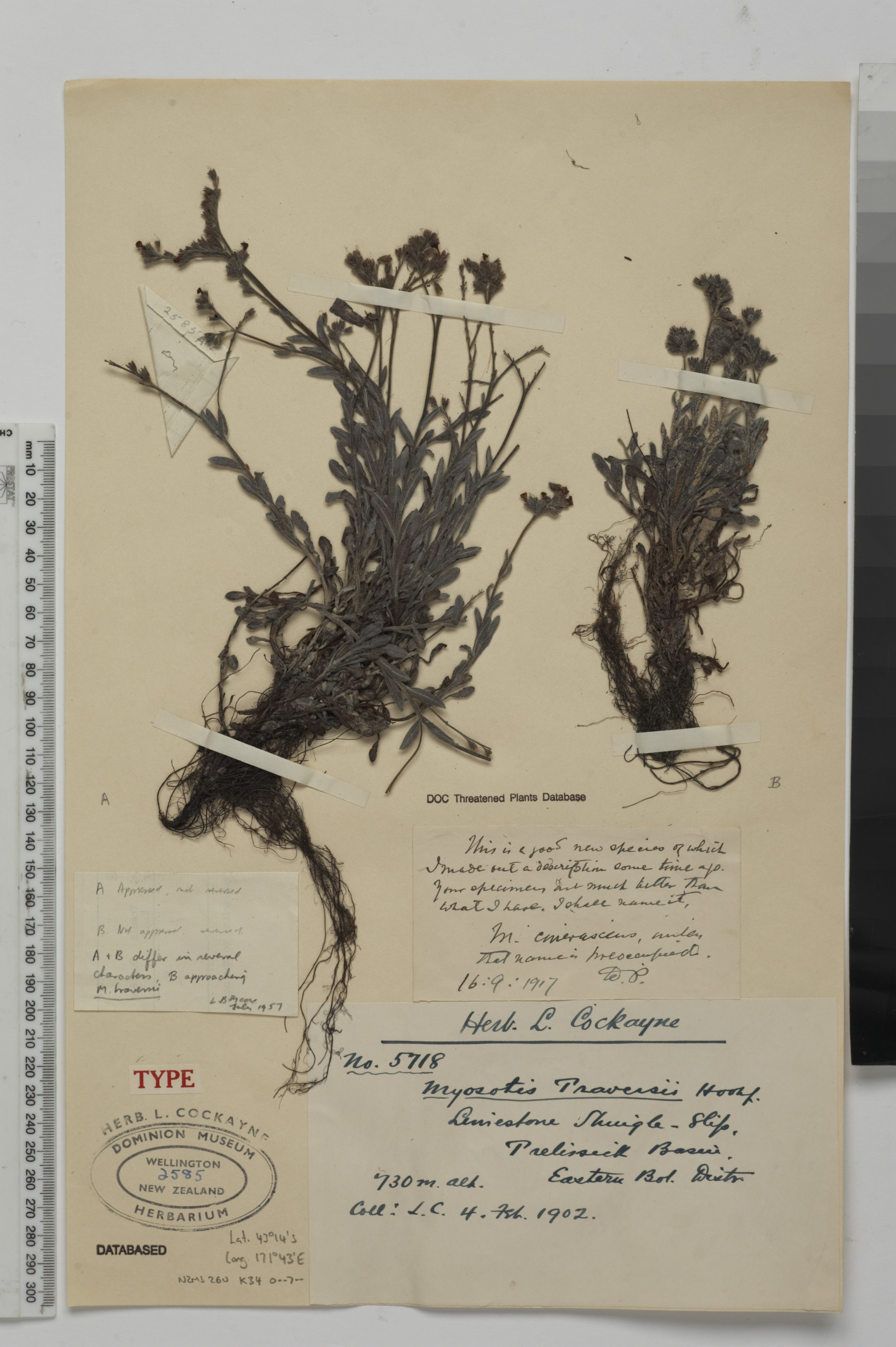
- Lectotype of M. cinerascens at Te Papa

Scientific classification
- Kingdom: Plantae
- Clade: Tracheophytes
- Clade: Angiosperms
- Clade: Eudicots
- Clade: Asterids
- Order: Boraginales
- Family: Boraginaceae
- Genus: Myosotis
- Species: M. × cinerascens

Binomial name
- Myosotis × cinerascens Petrie

Synonyms
- Myosotis cinerascens Petrie; Myosotis traversii var. cinerascens (Petrie) L.B.Moore

= Myosotis × cinerascens =

Species of flowering plant

Myosotis × cinerascens is a hybrid species of flowering plant in the family Boraginaceae, endemic to the South Island of New Zealand. Donald Petrie described M. cinerascens in 1891, and it was later deemed to be a hybrid in 2021. Plants of this forget-me-not are perennial rosettes which form tufts or clumps, with ebracteate, erect inflorescences, and white corollas with partly exserted stamens.

== Taxonomy and etymology ==
Myosotis × cinerascens is in the plant family Boraginaceae. The species was described by Donald Petrie in 1891.

The lectotype was designated by Lucy Moore, was collected by Leonard Cockayne in the Trelissick Basin, South Island, and is lodged at the herbarium of the Museum of New Zealand Te Papa Tongarewa (WELT SP002585, left hand specimen). Moore recognized the taxon as M. traversii var. cinerascens.

The specific epithet, cinerascens, is Latin and refers to the greyish or ash grey color of the leaves and other plant parts.

Morphological study showed that type specimen of Myosotis × cinerascens is similar to other ebracteate-erect species M. albosericea, M. goyenii, and M. monroi in its antrorse, straight, appressed hairs that are parallel to the mid vein. These characters were mentioned in the original description and can be used to distinguish M. × cinerascens from M. traversii. By contrast, M. × cinerascens has hooked hairs on the underside of the cauline leaves, which is only seen in one other New Zealand taxon, M. traversii subsp. cantabrica.

Morphological analysis showed that Myosotis × cinerascens is likely a rare hybrid involving M. traversii subsp. cantabrica and another species, possibly M. colensoi. Herbarium specimens of these three taxa have been collected together or near one another in the Castle Hill and Broken River areas of Canterbury, South Island. Several herbarium sheets, including the sheet that contains the type specimen, are mixed collections of M. × cinerascens and M. traversii subsp. cantabrica. The multiplication sign (×) before the species epithet signifies the likely hybrid origin of this nothospecies.'

== Phylogeny ==
Myosotis × cinerascens was not included in phylogenetic analyses of standard DNA sequencing markers (nuclear ribosomal DNA and chloroplast DNA regions). Within the southern hemisphere lineage, species relationships were not well resolved.

== Description ==
Myosotis × cinerascens plants are single rosettes that cluster together to form loose clumps or tufts. The rosette leaves have petioles 10–18 mm long. The rosette leaf blades are 4–26 mm long by 3–8 mm wide (length: width ratio 1.3–3.6: 1), usually oblanceolate or narrowly obovate, widest above the middle, with an obtuse apex. Both surfaces and the edges of the leaf are densely covered in appressed, straight to flexuous, antrorse (forward-facing) hairs that are oriented mostly parallel to the mid vein. Each rosette has 1–11 erect, once-branched ebracteate inflorescences that are up to 230 mm long and are bifurcating in an open forked 'V' shape near the tips. The cauline leaves are up to 16 per inflorescence and are similar to the rosette leaves but smaller with shorter petioles, and decrease in size and become sessile toward the tip. Each inflorescence has up to 64 flowers, each borne on a pedicel up to 3 mm long at fruiting, and each without a bract. The calyx is about 4 mm long at flowering and 4–7 mm long at fruiting, lobed to one-third to one-half its length, and densely covered in antrorse hairs that are appressed to patent and flexuous, or patent to erect and hooked. The corolla is white, up to 5 mm in diameter, with a cylindrical tube, petals that are broadly ovate, very broadly ovate, or very broadly obovate, and small scales alternating with the petals. The stamens are about 6 mm long (measured from the base of the calyx to the anther tips). The anthers are partly exserted with the tips only surpassing the scales. The four smooth, shiny, medium brown nutlets are 1.9–2.4 mm long by 1.0–1.2 mm wide and narrowly ovoid or ovoid in shape.

The chromosome number of M. × cinerascens is unknown.

The pollen of M. × cinerascens is unknown.

It flowers and fruits from December–February.

== Distribution and habitat ==
Myosotis × cinerascens is a forget-me-not endemic to the area of Canterbury, New Zealand, found on limestone debris or shingle from 700 to 800 m ASL. It is considered to be an obligate calcicole (as Myosotis cinerascens). It has only been collected a handful of times in a specific area (Castle Hill and Broken River area, historically known as Trelissick Basin). Although most specimens are historic, the most recent collection is from 1995 (AK 222309) which is furthermore a mixed sheet that also contains M. traversii subsp. cantabrica.

== Conservation status ==
The species (as Myosotis cinerascens) is listed as Extinct on the most recent assessment (2017-2018) under the New Zealand Threatened Classification system for plants.
