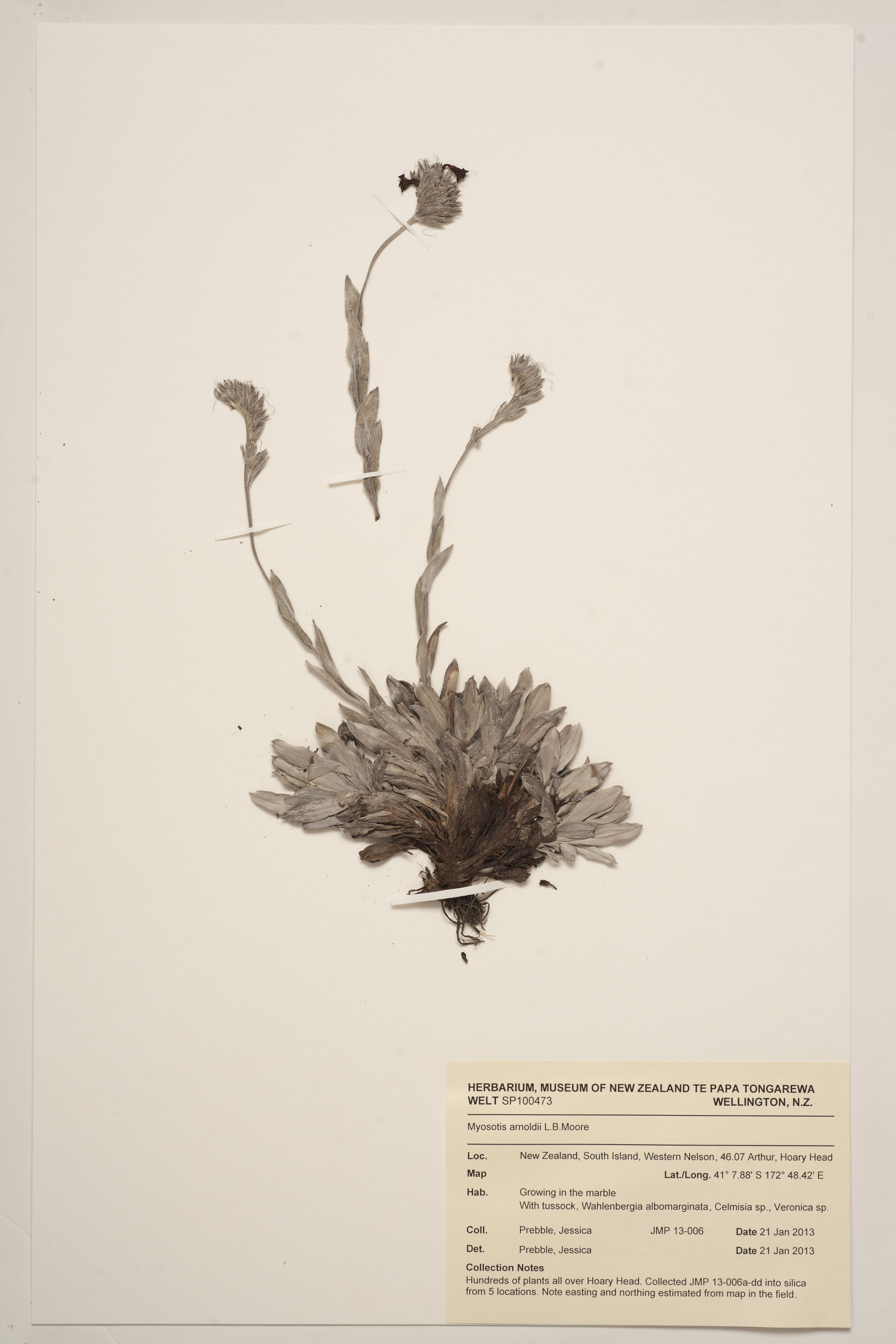
- Herbarium specimen of Myosotis arnoldii plant collected in 2013 WELT SP100473

Conservation status
- Naturally Uncommon (NZ TCS)

Scientific classification
- Kingdom: Plantae
- Clade: Tracheophytes
- Clade: Angiosperms
- Clade: Eudicots
- Clade: Asterids
- Order: Boraginales
- Family: Boraginaceae
- Genus: Myosotis
- Species: M. arnoldii

Binomial name
- Myosotis arnoldii L.B.Moore

= Myosotis arnoldii =

Species of flowering plant

Myosotis arnoldii is a species of flowering plant in the family Boraginaceae, endemic to the South Island of New Zealand. Lucy Moore described the species in 1961. Plants of this species of forget-me-not are perennial rosettes with ebracteate inflorescences, corollas ranging from yellow to dark purple, and stamens that are wholly exserted.

== Description ==
Myosotis arnoldii plants are rosettes. The rosette leaves have broad petioles that difficult to distinguish from the leaf blades. The rosette leaves are 30–70 mm long by 5–9 mm wide (length: width ratio ca. 3–7: 1), linear-spathulate or oblanceolate, and widest at or above the middle, with an subacute to obtuse apex. Both surfaces of the leaf are uniformly and densely covered in straight, appressed, white hairs that completely cover the underlying leaf surface. Each rosette has several erect, ebracteate inflorescences that are up to 180 mm long. The cauline leaves are similar to the rosette leaves, but smaller, are narrow-oblong and subacute, and have hairs similar to the rosette leaves.

The flowers are many per inflorescence, and each is borne on a short pedicel, each with a bract. The calyx is c. 8 mm long at flowering and fruiting, lobed to one-half of its length, and densely covered in straight, appressed antrorse hairs, as well as some erect hooked hairs near the base. The corolla is yellow to dark purple, "deeply coloured", and about 8–10 mm in diameter, with a cylindrical tube, and small scales alternating with the petals. The anthers are exserted with the anthers surpassing the faucal scales. The nutlets were not described. Flowering occurs between October and January and fruiting from December to May.

== Taxonomy ==
Myosotis arnoldii is in the plant family Boraginaceae and was originally described in 1961 by Lucy Moore in the Flora of New Zealand.

The original specimens (isotypes) of this species were collected by Arnold Wall from "Ben More, Ure River, Marlborough", South Island, New Zealand. The specimens collected by Wall are housed are lodged at the Museum of New Zealand Te Papa Tongarewa, Wellington (herbarium WELT).

The specific epithet, arnoldii, is named after Arnold Wall (1869 – 1966), a New Zealand botanist who made the first collections.

Lucy Moore suggested that Myosotis arnoldii is morphologically most similar to M. angustata and M. macrantha based on habit and leaves, and to M. albosericea based on the very dense covering of white, appressed hairs on its vegetative parts including the rosette and stem leaves, which completely obscure the epidermis. These hairs are antrorse (forward facing), straight, and on the leaf are oriented parallel to the midrib. The only other New Zealand species with such hairs is Myosotis albosericea, endemic to southern South Island, New Zealand.

=== Phylogeny ===
No individuals of M. arnoldii were included in phylogenetic analyses of standard DNA sequencing markers (nuclear ribosomal DNA and chloroplast DNA regions) of New Zealand Myosotis. In those studies, within the southern hemisphere lineage, species relationships were not well resolved.

Three individuals from one population of M. arnoldii were also genotyped in a study that developed microsatellite DNA markers for another species group of New Zealand Myosotis. The individuals of M. arnoldii included showed a high number of alleles that cross-amplified at most of the microsatellite loci.

== Distribution and habitat ==
Myosotis arnoldii is a forget-me-not is known to occur in two disjunct populations in the northern part of the South Island, New Zealand. This species grows on cliff faces and other rocky habitats on marble substrates on Hoary Head, North West Nelson and on limestone substrates at its type locality in the Chalk Range, Marlborough.

Myosotis arnoldii is likely to be an outcrossing species, with plants requiring a pollinating vector to achieve pollination and seed set.

== Conservation status ==
Myosotis arnoldii is listed as At Risk – Naturally Uncommon with the qualifiers Data Poor (DP) and Range Restricted (RR) on the most recent assessment (2017–2018) under the New Zealand Threatened Classification system for plants.
