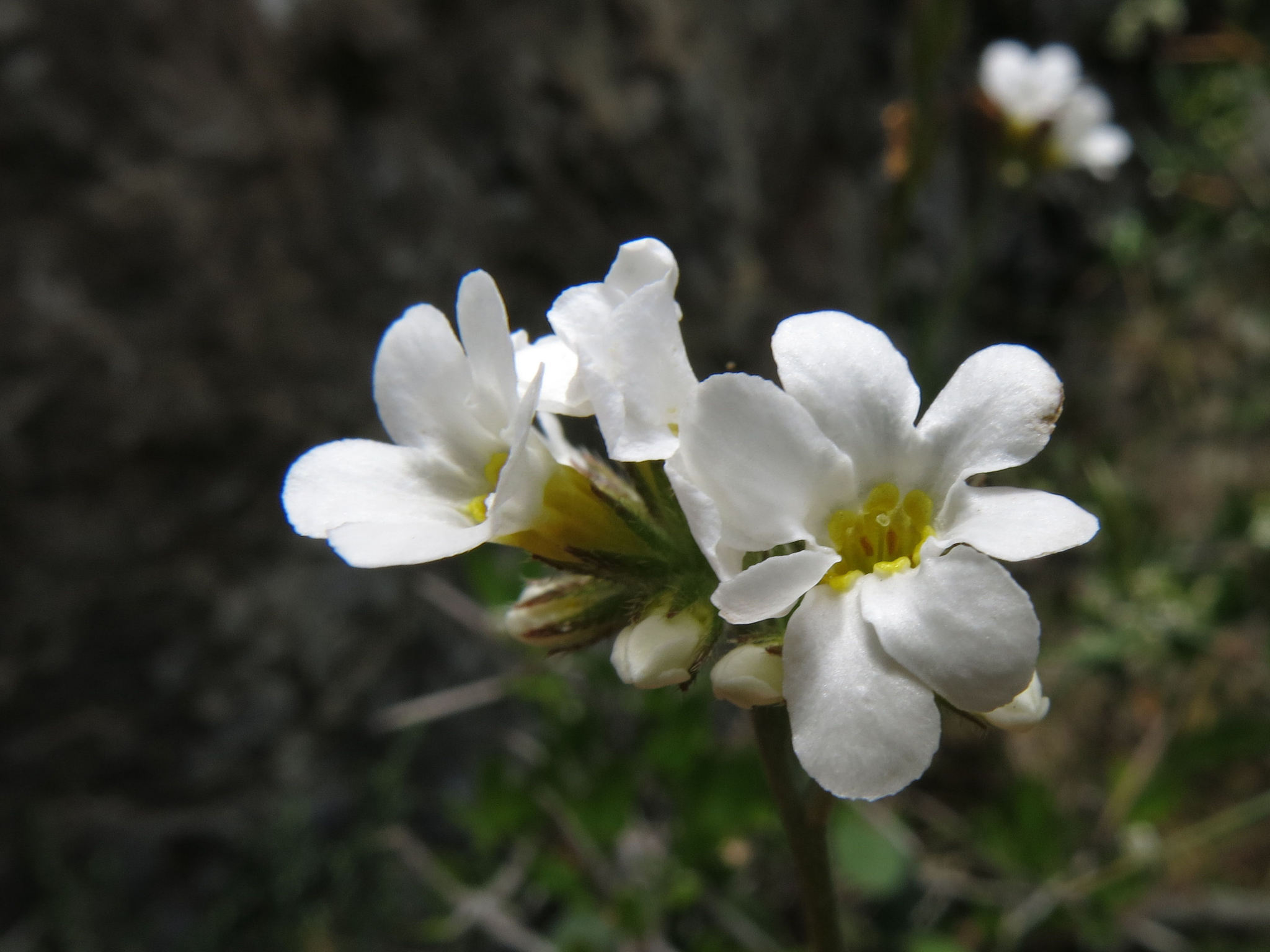
- Flowers of Myosotis goyenii subsp. infima

Scientific classification
- Kingdom: Plantae
- Clade: Tracheophytes
- Clade: Angiosperms
- Clade: Eudicots
- Clade: Asterids
- Order: Boraginales
- Family: Boraginaceae
- Genus: Myosotis
- Species: M. goyenii
- Subspecies: M. g. subsp. infima

Trinomial name
- Myosotis goyenii subsp. infima Meudt & Heenan

= Myosotis goyenii subsp. infima =

Species of flowering plant

Myosotis goyenii subsp. infima is a subspecies of flowering plant in the family Boraginaceae, endemic to central South Island of New Zealand. Heidi Meudt and Peter Heenan described this subspecies in 2021. Plants of this subspecies of forget-me-not are perennial rosettes which form caespitose clumps, with ebracteate, erect inflorescences, and white corollas with fully incluced stamens.

== Taxonomy and etymology ==
Myosotis goyenii subsp. infima Meudt & Heenan is in the plant family Boraginaceae. The subspecies was described by Heidi Meudt and Peter Heenan in 2021.

The holotype was collected by Peter Heenan and Miles Giller in Canterbury, Waipara, South Dean and is lodged at the Allan Herbarium of Manaaki Whenua - Landcare Research (CHR 666639). There is also an isotype is lodged at the herbarium of the Museum of New Zealand Te Papa Tongarewa (WELT SP111309).

The subspecific epithet, infima, means lowest or lowermost in Latin (infimus), and refers to the filaments in the flower which are attached much lower in the corolla tube than those of M. goyenii subsp. goyenii.

This is one of two subspecies recognized in Myosotis goyenii; the other is M. goyenii subsp. goyenii. The subspecies are allopatric, with M. goyenii subsp. infima found on limestone and calcareous siltstone in Marlborough and Canterbury and M. goyenii subsp. goyenii occupying schist rocks in Southland and Otago.

M. goyenii subsp. infima plants can be distinguished from M. goyenii subsp. goyenii by its caespitose clumps of multiple rosettes that have fibrous roots, and have flowers with a short style (< 6 mm), pistil that is < 1.5× longer than the calyx, filaments attached > 1 mm below the faucal scales, and anthers fully included. By contrast, plants of M. goyenii subsp. infima form clumps of single rosettes that have a central woody taproot, and the following floral characteristics: a long style (> 6 mm), pistil that is 1.6–2.8× longer than the calyx, filaments attached < 1 mm below the scales, and anthers only partly included (with the tips equal to or just surpassing the scales).

== Phylogeny ==
Myosotis goyenii was shown to be a part of the monophyletic southern hemisphere lineage of Myosotis in phylogenetic analyses of standard DNA sequencing markers (nuclear ribosomal DNA and chloroplast DNA regions). Within the southern hemisphere lineage, species relationships were not well resolved. Of the three individuals of M. goyenii sequenced in these studies, one is from Canterbury (M. goyenii subsp. infima).

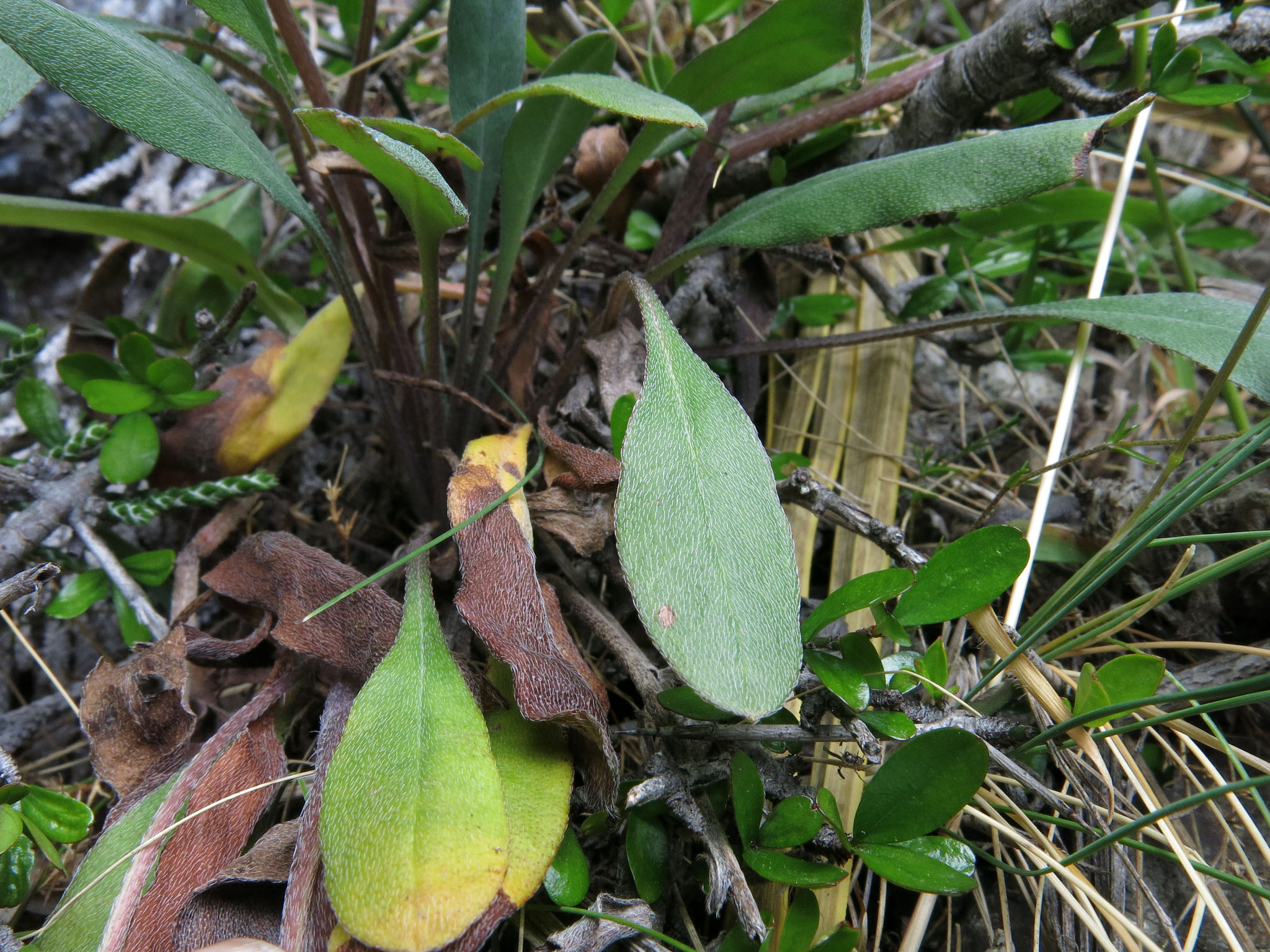
Rosette leaves

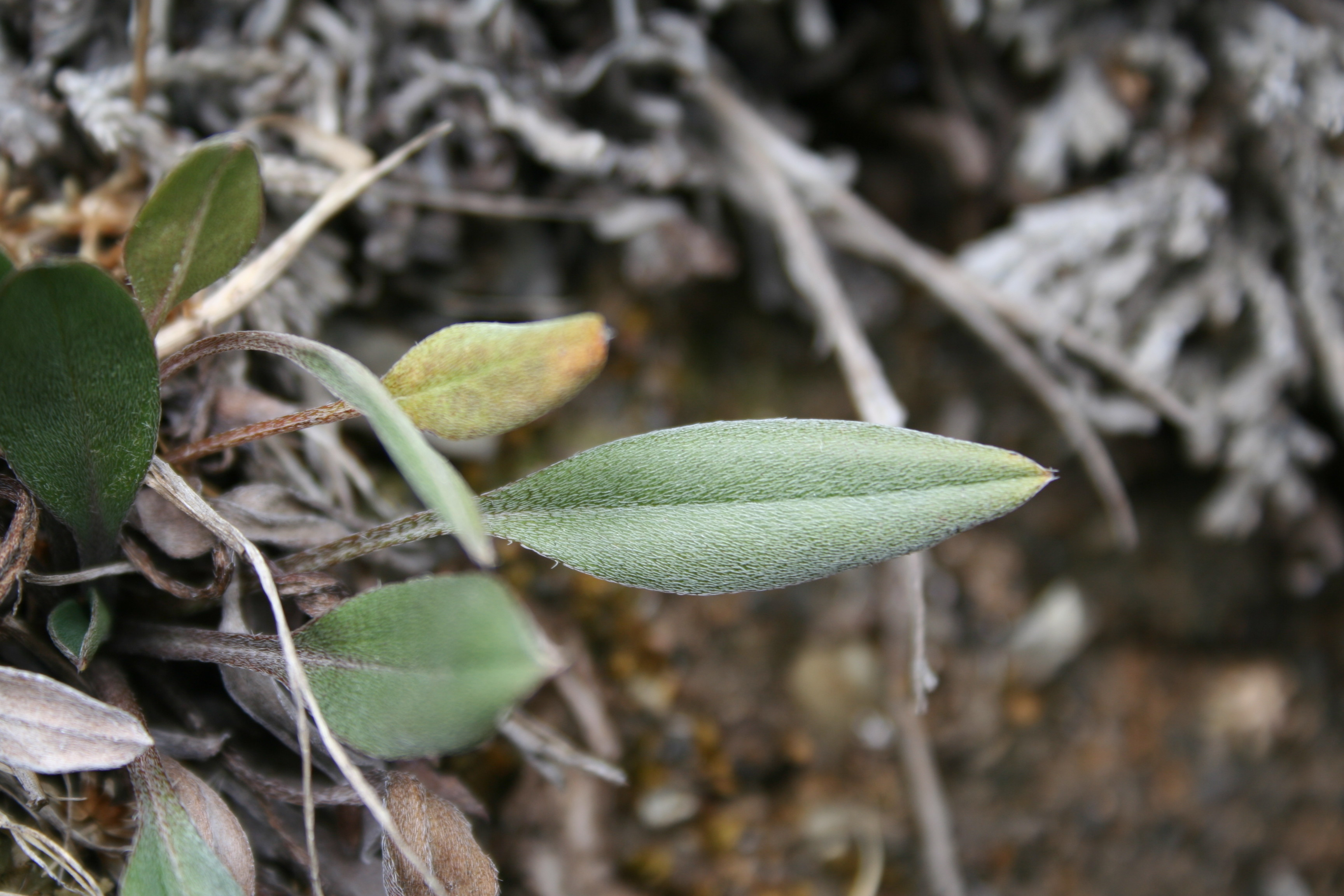
Detail of rosette leaves

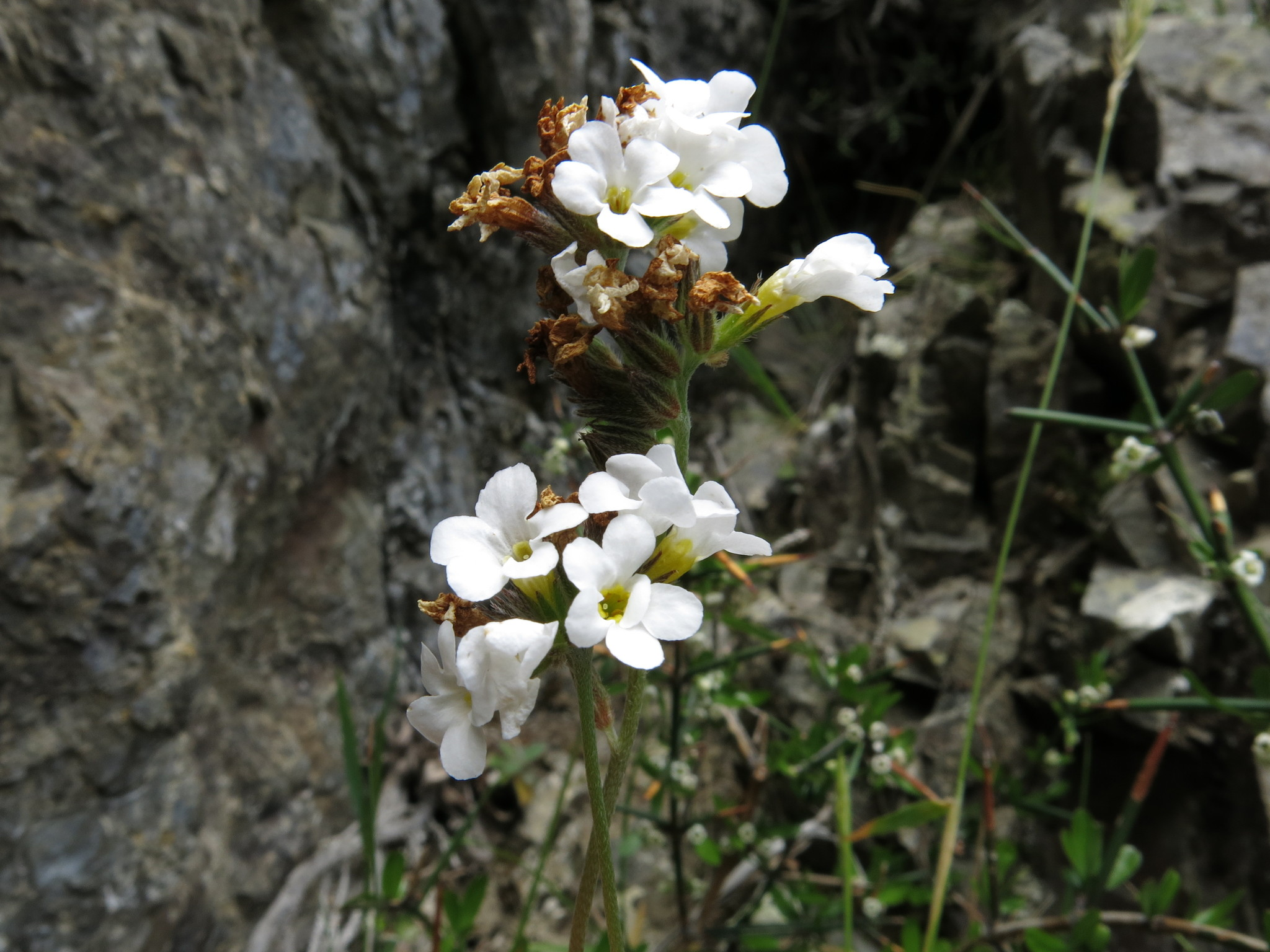
Inflorescences

== Description ==
Myosotis goyenii subsp. infima plants are single rosettes with fibrous roots that often grow together to form caespitose clumps or tufts. The rosette leaves have petioles 10–48 mm long. The rosette leaf blades are 7–40 mm long by 3–11 mm wide (length: width ratio 2.2–5.3: 1), usually narrowly oblanceolate, oblanceolate or narrowly obovate, widest at or above the middle (rarely below the middle), with an acute apex (rarely obtuse). Both surfaces and the edges of the leaf are densely covered in straight, appressed, antrorse (forward-facing) hairs that are oriented parallel to the mid vein. Each rosette has 2–40 erect, usually once-branched (sometimes unbranched), ebracteate inflorescences that are up to 350 mm long and are usually bifurcating in an open, forked 'V' shape near the tips. The cauline leaves are up to 8 per inflorescence and are similar to the rosette leaves but smaller with shorter petioles, and decrease in size toward the tip. Each inflorescence has up to 26 flowers, each borne on a pedicel up to 3 mm long at fruiting, and each without a bract. The calyx is 3–5 mm long at flowering and 4–6 mm long at fruiting, lobed to half to almost all of its length, and densely covered in antrorse, straight to flexuous, appressed to patent hairs. The corolla is white, up to 14 mm in diameter, with a cylindrical tube, petals that are broadly ovate, obovate, broadly obovate or broadly obovate, and small yellow scales alternating with the petals. The stamens are 4.5–6.3 mm long (measured from the base of the calyx to the anther tips) with filaments 0.4–0.7 mm long that are attached to the corolla tube > 1 mm below the base of the scales. The anthers are fully included in the corolla tube. The pistil is 5–7 mm long with a style that is 3–6 mm long at fruiting. The four smooth, shiny, light to dark brown nutlets are 1.7–2.7 mm long by 1.0–1.3 mm wide and narrowly ovoid in shape.

The chromosome number of M. goyenii subsp. infima is unknown.

The pollen of M. goyenii subsp. infima is unknown.

It flowers and fruits from October–June, with the main flowering and fruiting period in January.

== Distribution and habitat ==
Myosotis goyenii subsp. infima is a forget-me-not endemic to Marlborough and Canterbury in the South Island of New Zealand, from 450–1200 m ASL. It is found on rock (limestone and calcareous siltstone) slopes, outcrops, crevices and escarpments.

== Conservation status ==
The subspecies M. goyenii subsp. infima was assessed (as taxonomically indeterminate Myosotis "Waipapa") as being Data Deficient. It was not yet assessed in the most recent assessment (2017-2018) under the New Zealand Threatened Classification system for plants.
