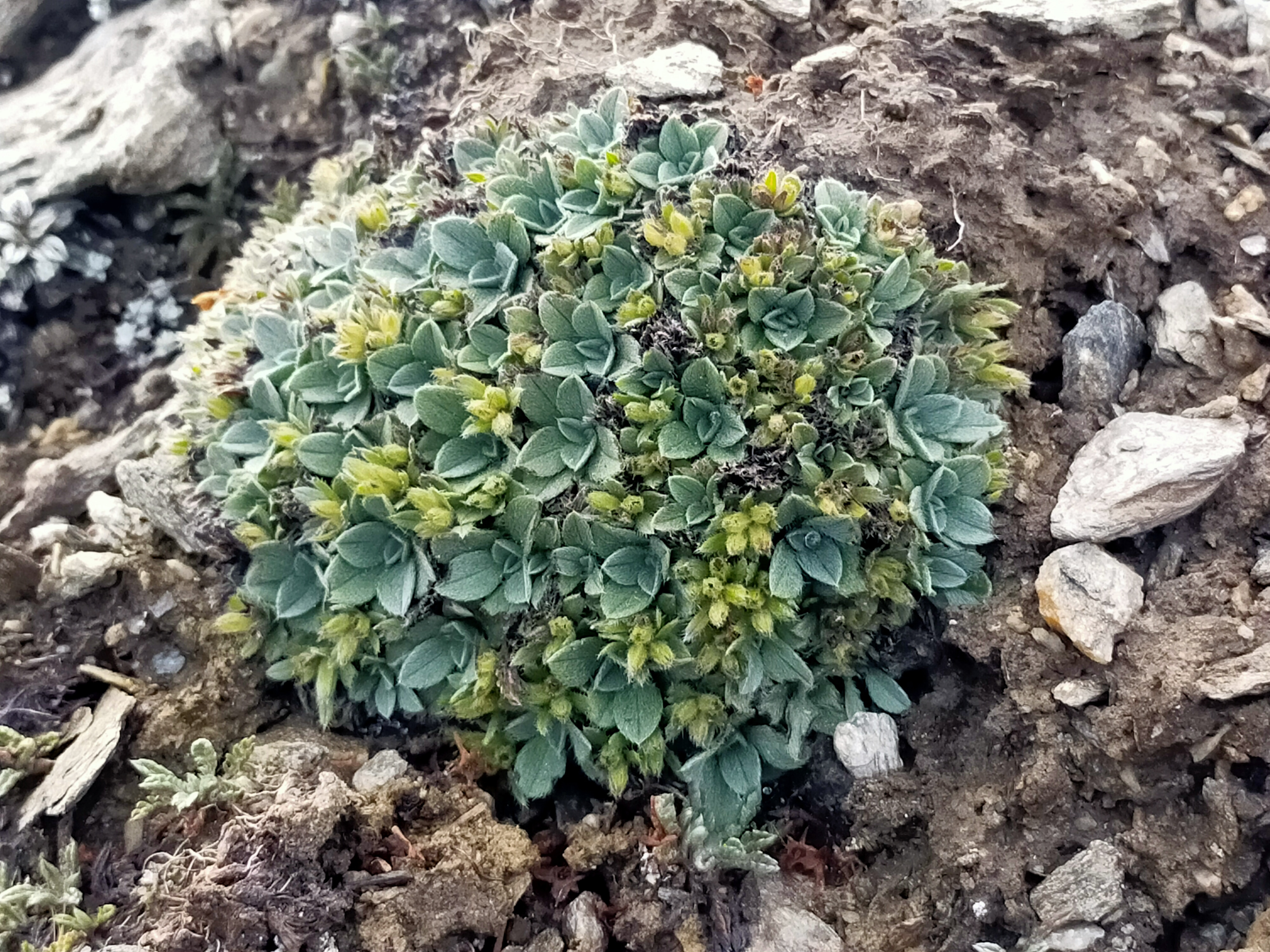

Conservation status
- Nationally Critical (NZ TCS)

Scientific classification
- Kingdom: Plantae
- Clade: Tracheophytes
- Clade: Angiosperms
- Clade: Eudicots
- Clade: Asterids
- Order: Boraginales
- Family: Boraginaceae
- Genus: Myosotis
- Species: M. cheesemanii

Binomial name
- Myosotis cheesemanii Petrie

= Myosotis cheesemanii =

Species of flowering plant

Myosotis cheesemanii is a species of flowering plant in the family Boraginaceae, endemic to the South Island of New Zealand. Donald Petrie described the species in 1886. Plants of this species of forget-me-not are perennial rosettes with bracteate inflorescences and white corollas.

== Taxonomy and etymology ==
Myosotis cheesemanii Petrie is in the plant family Boraginaceae and was originally described in 1886 by Donald Petrie. M cheesemanii is morphologically most similar to M. colensoi, from which it can be distinguished by its rosette laminas which are shorter (< 6.4 mm) with a smaller length : width ratio (1.2–1.9 : 1), longer petioles, and smaller rosettes.

The type specimen of Myosotis cheesemanii is lodged at the Museum of New Zealand Te Papa Tongarewa, Wellington (herbarium WELT). Anthony Druce collected the type specimen of this species from Takaka Valley in north-west Nelson in 1977.

The specific epithet, cheesemanii, is named after New Zealand botanist Thomas Cheeseman (1845–1923).

== Phylogeny ==
Myosotis cheesemanii was not included in phylogenetic analyses of standard DNA sequencing markers (nuclear ribosomal DNA and chloroplast DNA regions).

== Description ==
Myosotis cheesemanii plants are single rosettes that grow close together forming loose clumps. The rosette leaves have petioles 1–6 mm long. The rosette leaf blades are 3–9 mm long by 1–3 mm wide (length: width ratio 1.2–2.2: 1), narrowly obovate or broadly obovate, rarely elliptic or broadly ovate, widest at or above the middle, with an obtuse apex. The upper surface of the leaf is densely covered in straight, mostly appressed, antrorse (forward-facing) hairs that are parallel to the mid vein, while on the lower surface the hairs are the same or sometimes the hairs are fewer or even lacking. Each rosette has 4–7 prostrate, sometimes ascending, unbranched, bracteate inflorescences that are 14–36 mm long. The cauline leaves on the lower part of the inflorescence are similar to but smaller than the rosette leaves, but usually with an acute apex, and decrease in size toward the tip. There can be up to 5 flowers in each inflorescence, each one borne on a short pedicel and with a bract. The calyx is 4–5 mm long at flowering and 5–6 mm long at fruiting, lobed to about a third of its length, and densely covered in short, straight, appressed, antrorse hairs. The corolla is white up to 8 mm in diameter, with a cylindrical tube, petals that are broadly obovate and flat, and small yellow scales alternating with the petals. The anthers are partially exserted, with the tips only surpassing the scales. The four smooth, shiny, medium brown nutlets are about 1.7 mm long by about 0.9 mm wide and ovoid or narrowly ovoid in shape.

Myosotis cheesemanii has M. uniflora type pollen.

The chromosome number of M. cheesemanii is unknown.

It flowers in January and fruits in February.

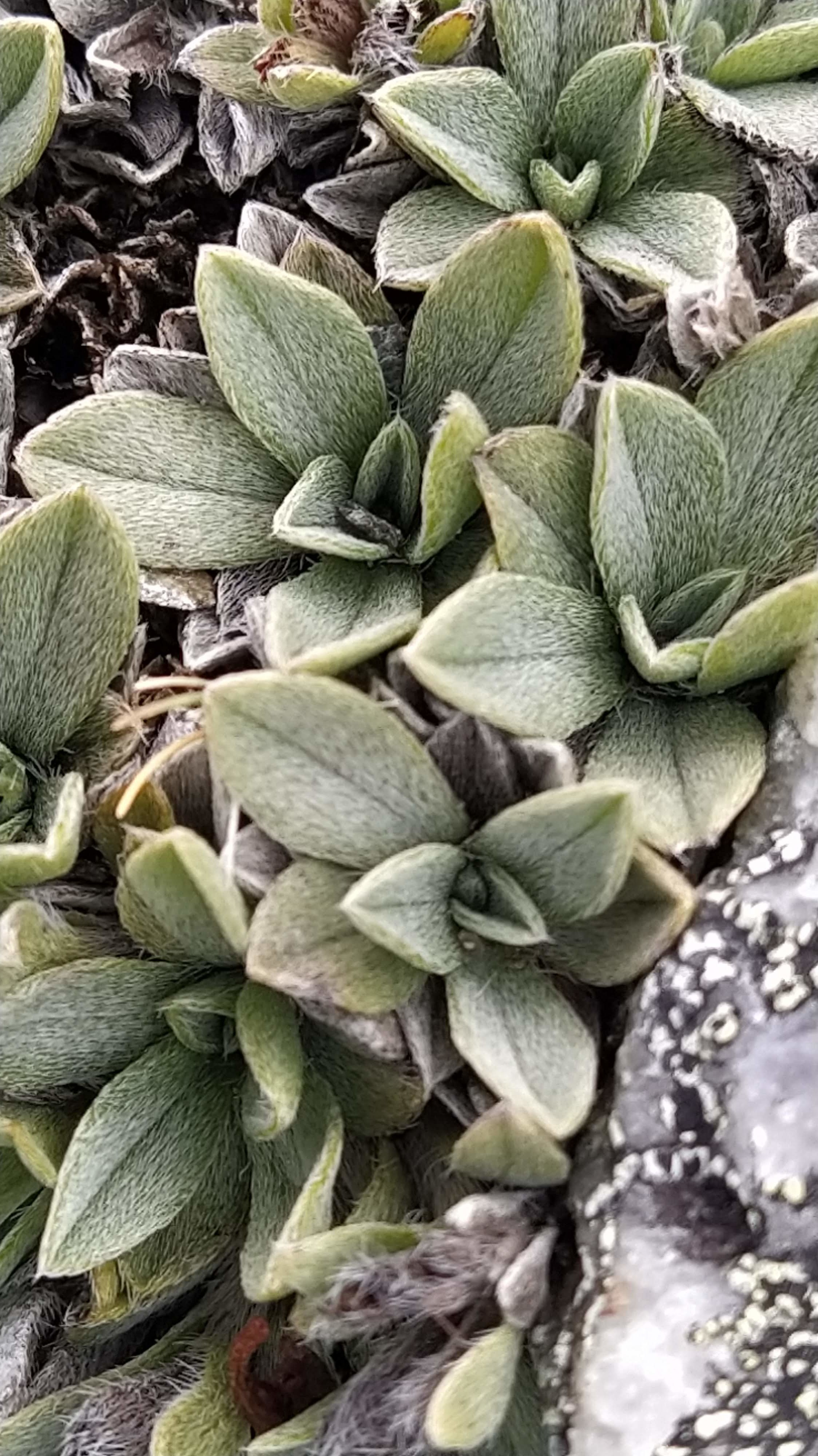
Rosette leaves

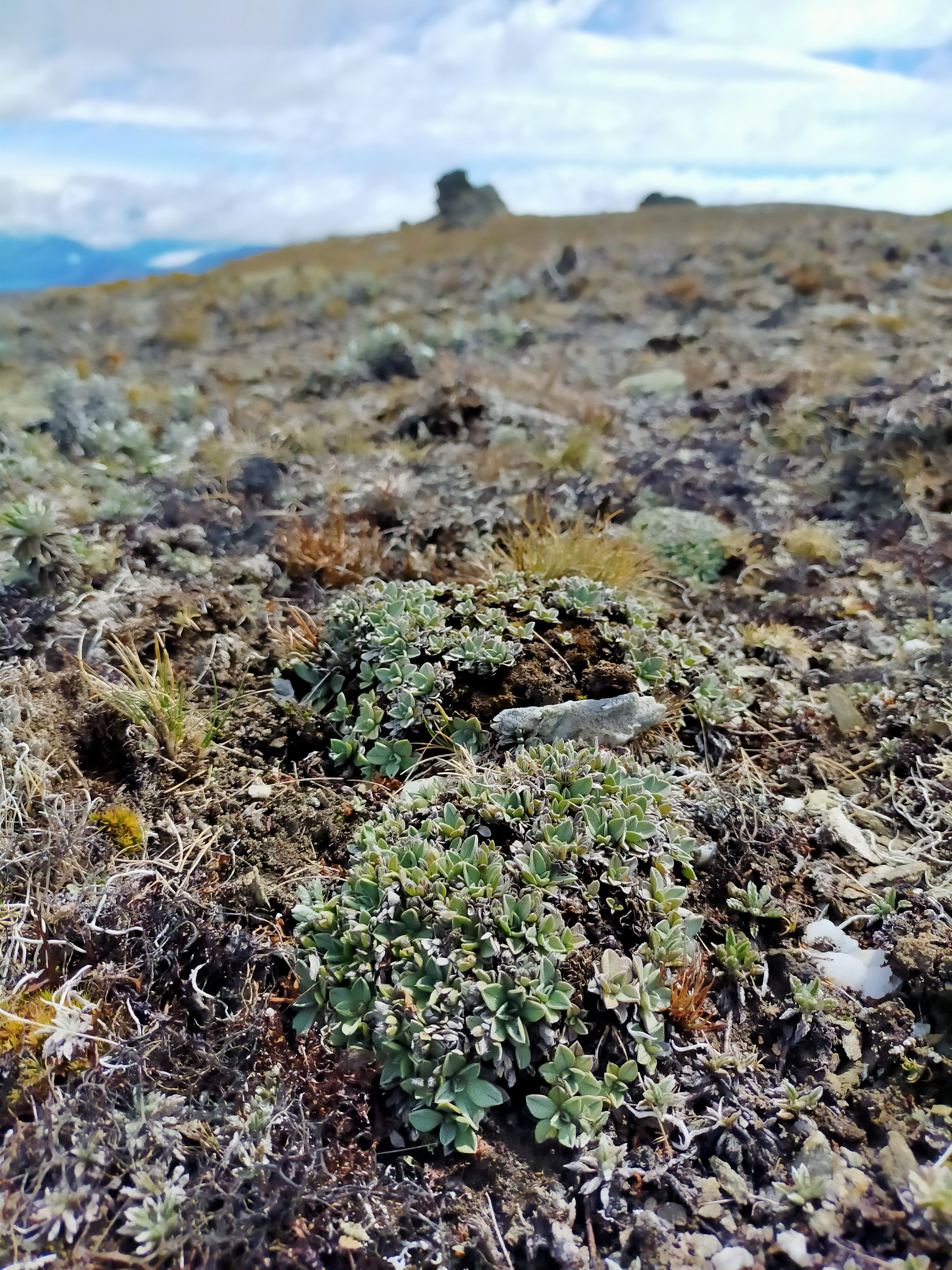
Habit and habitat

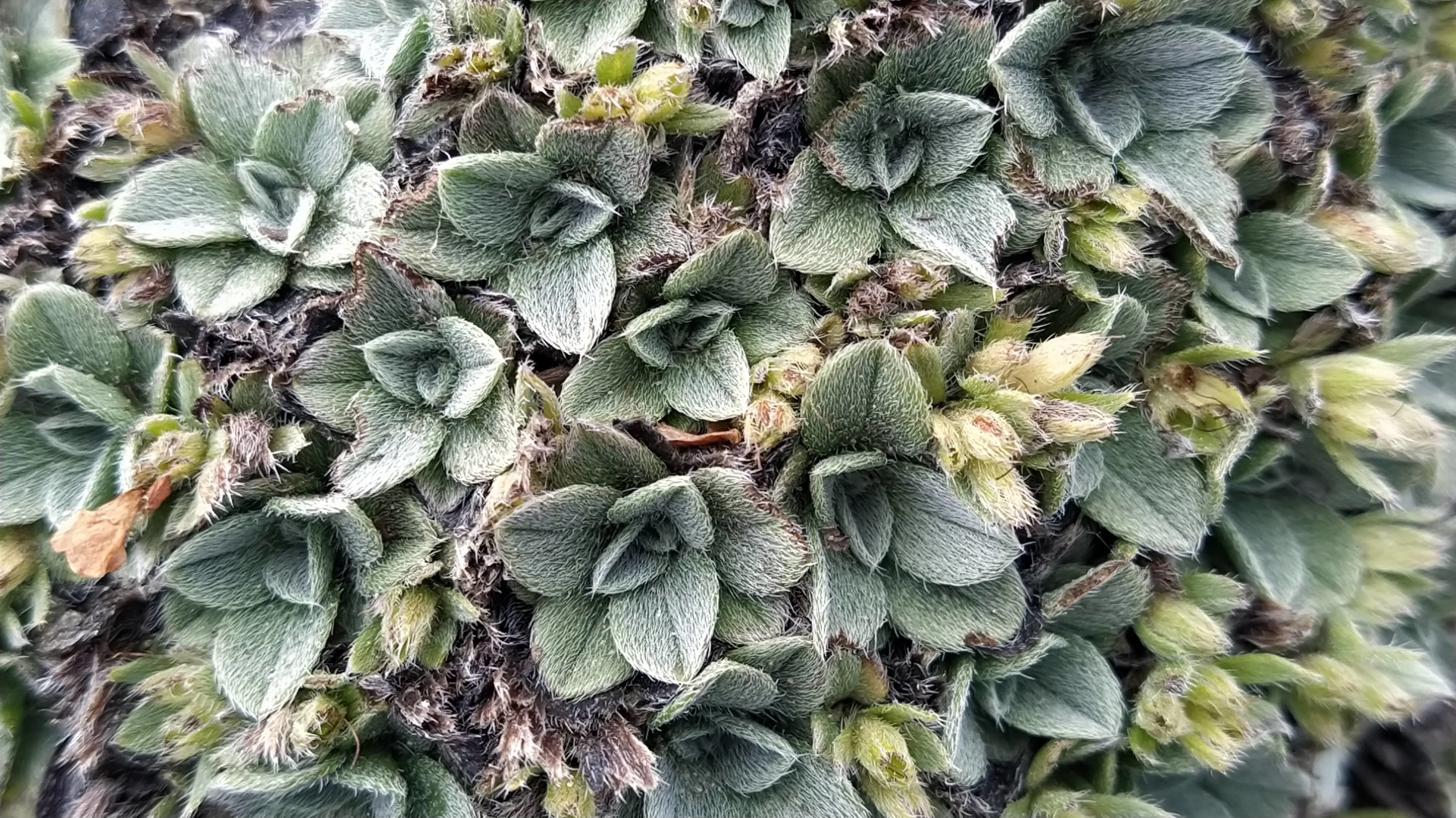
Growth habit with forming fruits

== Distribution and habitat ==
Myosotis cheesemanii is endemic to the South Island of New Zealand in Otago, from (780–)1700–1800 m ASL m elevation. M. cheesemanii is found in herbfields, on steep shingle faces, at the base of schist tors, or near snowdrifts.

== Conservation status ==
The species is listed as Threatened - Nationally Critical the most recent assessment (2017-2018) of the New Zealand Threatened Classification for plants. It also has the qualifiers "DP" (Data Poor), "RR" (Sparse) and "Sp" (Sparse).
