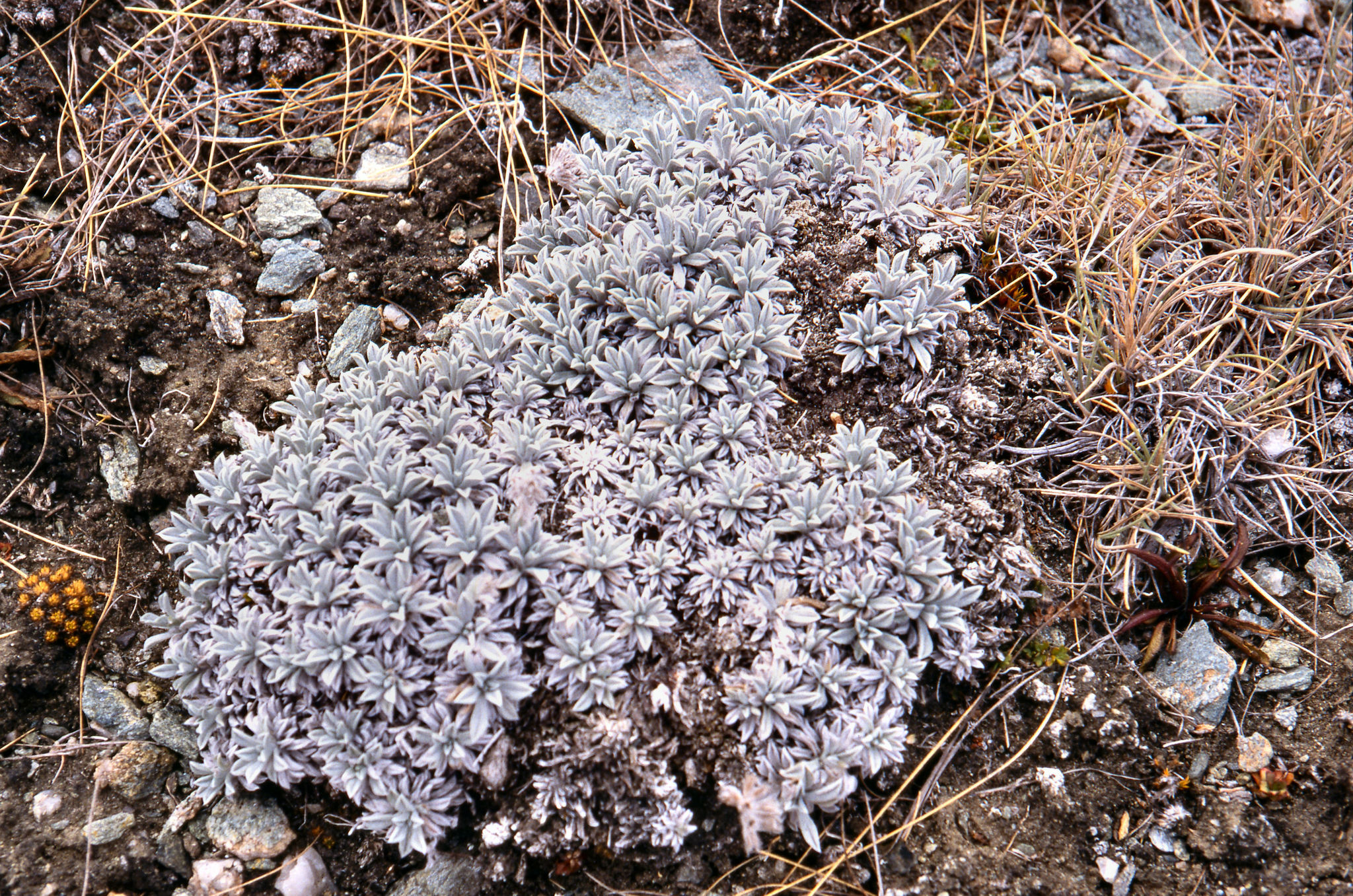
- Myosotis albosericea habit

Conservation status
- Nationally Critical (NZ TCS)

Scientific classification
- Kingdom: Plantae
- Clade: Tracheophytes
- Clade: Angiosperms
- Clade: Eudicots
- Clade: Asterids
- Order: Boraginales
- Family: Boraginaceae
- Genus: Myosotis
- Species: M. albosericea

Binomial name
- Myosotis albosericea Hook.f.

= Myosotis albosericea =

Species of flowering plant

Myosotis albosericea is a species of flowering plant in the family Boraginaceae, endemic to the South Island of New Zealand. Joseph Dalton Hooker described the species in 1867. Plants of this species of forget-me-not are perennial rosettes which form loose clumps, with ebracteate, erect inflorescences, and yellow corollas.

== Taxonomy and etymology ==
Myosotis albosericea Hook.f. is in the plant family Boraginaceae and was described in 1867 by Joseph Dalton Hooker.

Myosotis albosericea plants have a very dense covering of white, appressed hairs on its vegetative parts including the rosette and stem leaves, which completely obscure the epidermis. The hairs are antrorse (forward facing), straight, and on the leaf are oriented parallel to the midrib. The only other New Zealand species with such hairs is Myosotis arnoldii, endemic to northern South Island, New Zealand. Additional characters that, taken together, can help distinguish M. albosericea from other native New Zealand species include: yellow corollas, unbranched ebracteate inflorescences, small rosette leaf blades (< 12 mm long) with acute tips, and lack of hooked or retrorse (backward facing) hairs anywhere on the plant.

The holotype specimen of Myosotis albosericea was collected by James Hector in 1863 from the Clutha River, Otago, New Zealand and is lodged at Kew Herbarium (K 000787886).

The specific epithet, albosericea, is derived from Latin for the white (albus) and silky (sericeus) hairs which cover most of the plant.

== Phylogeny ==
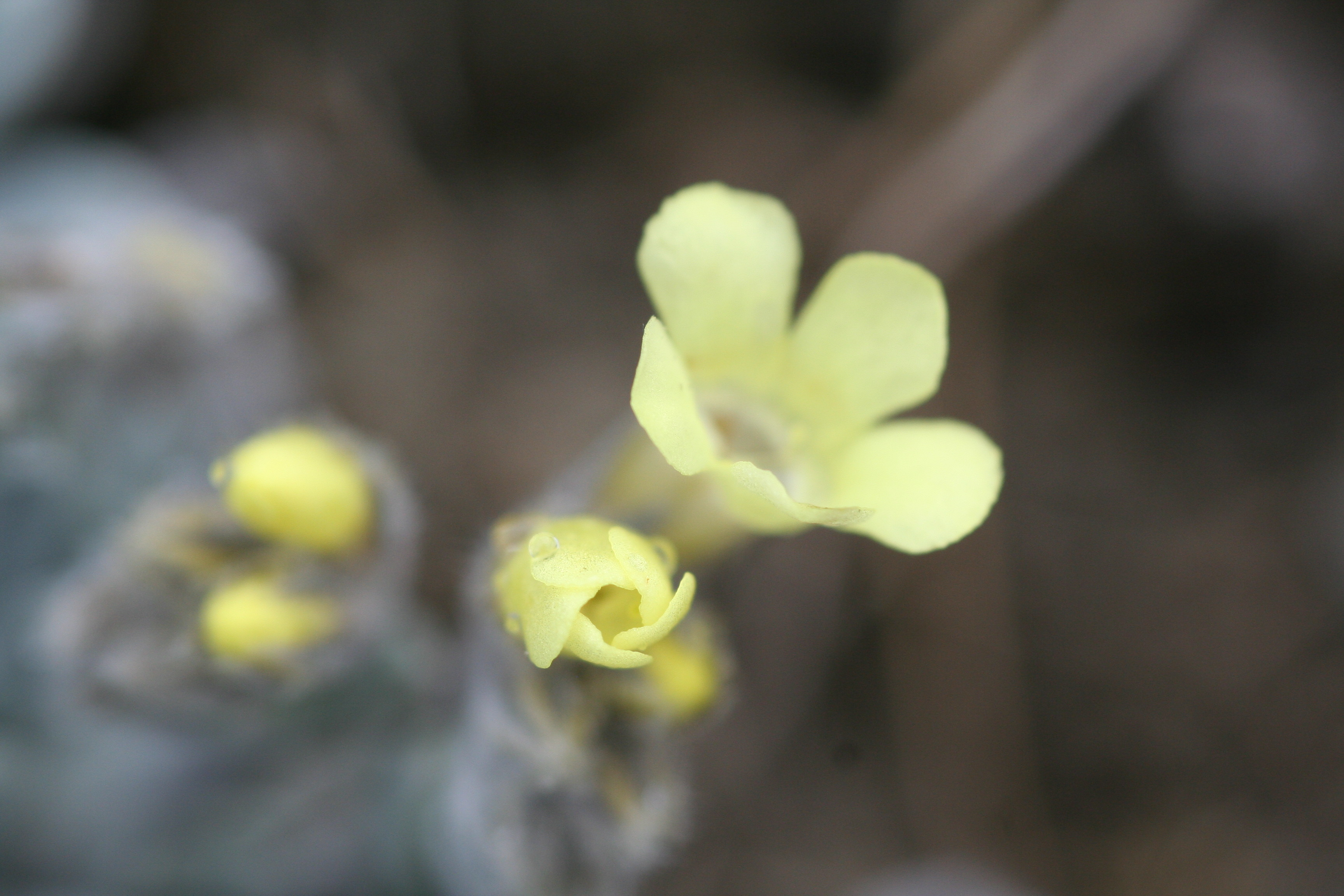
Close up of yellow flower and opening bud of M. albosericea

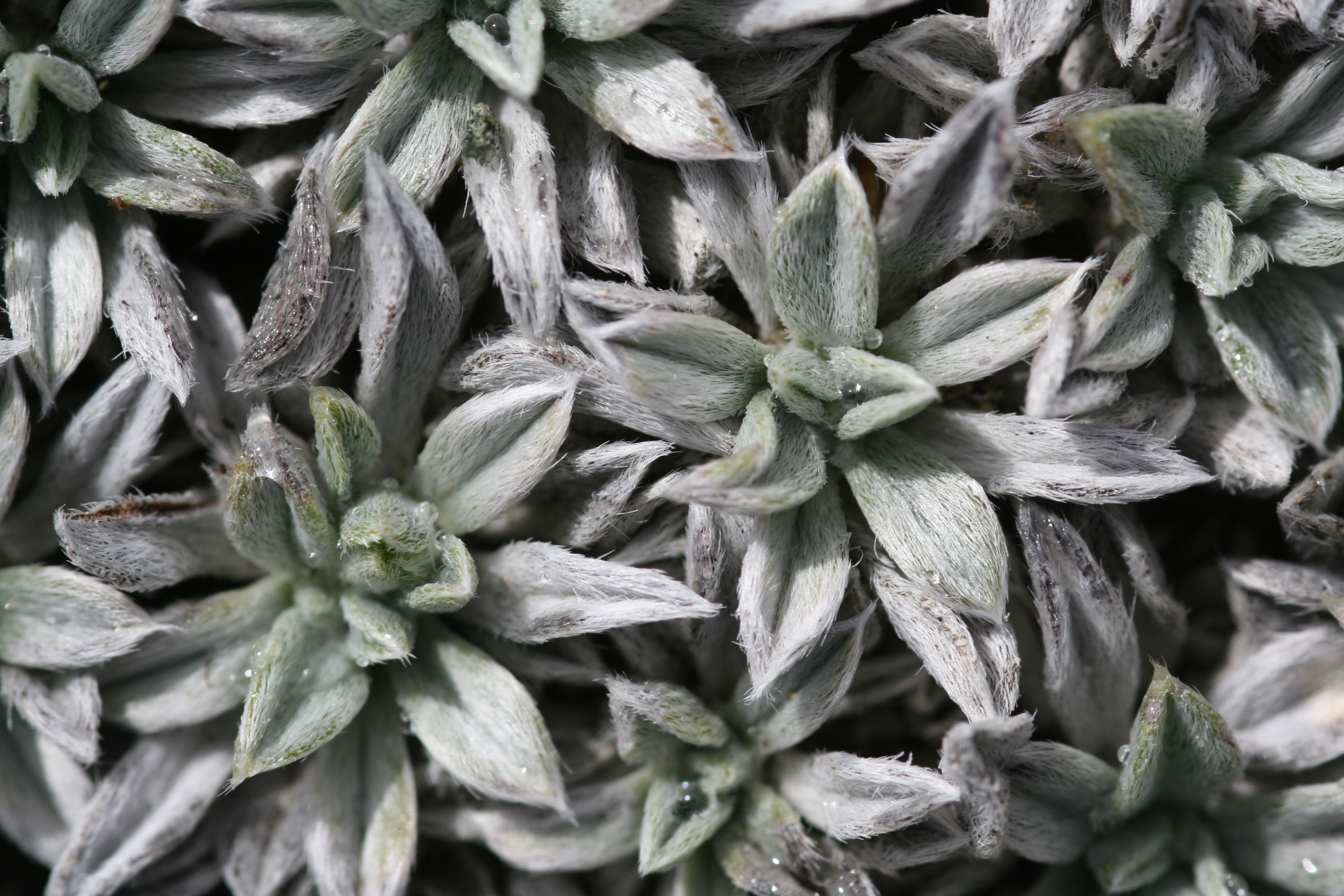
Close up of rosette leaves showing dense covering of white, silky, long, straight, appressed, forward-facing hairs

Myosotis albosericea was shown to be a part of the monophyletic southern hemisphere lineage of Myosotis in phylogenetic analyses of standard DNA sequencing markers (nuclear ribosomal DNA and chloroplast DNA regions). Within the southern hemisphere lineage, species relationships were not well resolved. The sole sequenced individual of M. albosericea grouped with other ebracteate-erect species and especially the South Island endemic species, M. goyenii.

== Description ==
Myosotis albosericea plants are single rosettes, each with a central and often woody taproot, that grow together to form loose mats. The rosette leaves have petioles 4–20 mm long. The rosette leaf blades are 4–12 mm long by 1–4 mm wide (length: width ratio 1.4–7.6: 1), narrowly oblanceolate, oblanceolate, narrowly obovate or obovate, widest at or above the middle, with an acute apex. The upper and lower surfaces and margins of the leaf are densely covered in silky, long, straight, appressed, antrorse (forward-facing) hairs that are oriented parallel to the mid vein. Each rosette has 1–4 erect, unbranched, ebracteate inflorescences that are up to 160 mm long. The cauline leaves are similar to the rosette leaves but smaller, and decrease in size toward the tip. Each inflorescence has up to 18 flowers, each borne on a short pedicel, without a bract. The calyx is 3–5 mm long at flowering and 3–6 mm long at fruiting, lobed to half or three-quarters its length, and densely covered in antrorse, straight or flexuous, patent or sometimes appressed hairs. The corolla is yellow, up to 10 mm in diameter, with a cylindrical tube, petals that are obovate, broadly obovate or very broadly obovate, and small scales alternating with the petals. The anthers are partly exserted, with the tips only surpassing or equaling the scales (rarely fully included with the tips reaching the base of the faucal scales only). The four smooth, shiny, light to dark brown nutlets are 1.8–2.2 mm long by 0.8–1.2 mm wide and narrowly ovoid to ovoid in shape.

The chromosome number of M. albosericea is unknown.

The pollen of M. albosericea is unknown.

It flowers and fruits from September–February, with the main flowering period December–February and the main fruiting period January–March.

== Distribution and habitat ==
Myosotis albosericea is a forget-me-not endemic to the mountains of Otago, South Island of New Zealand from 1520–1554 m ASL. M. albosericea is known from only one extant population on dry rock or shingle in cushion fellfield.

== Conservation status ==
The species is listed as "Threatened - Nationally Critical" on the most recent assessment (2017–2018) under the New Zealand Threatened Classification system for plants, with the qualifier "OL" (One Location).
