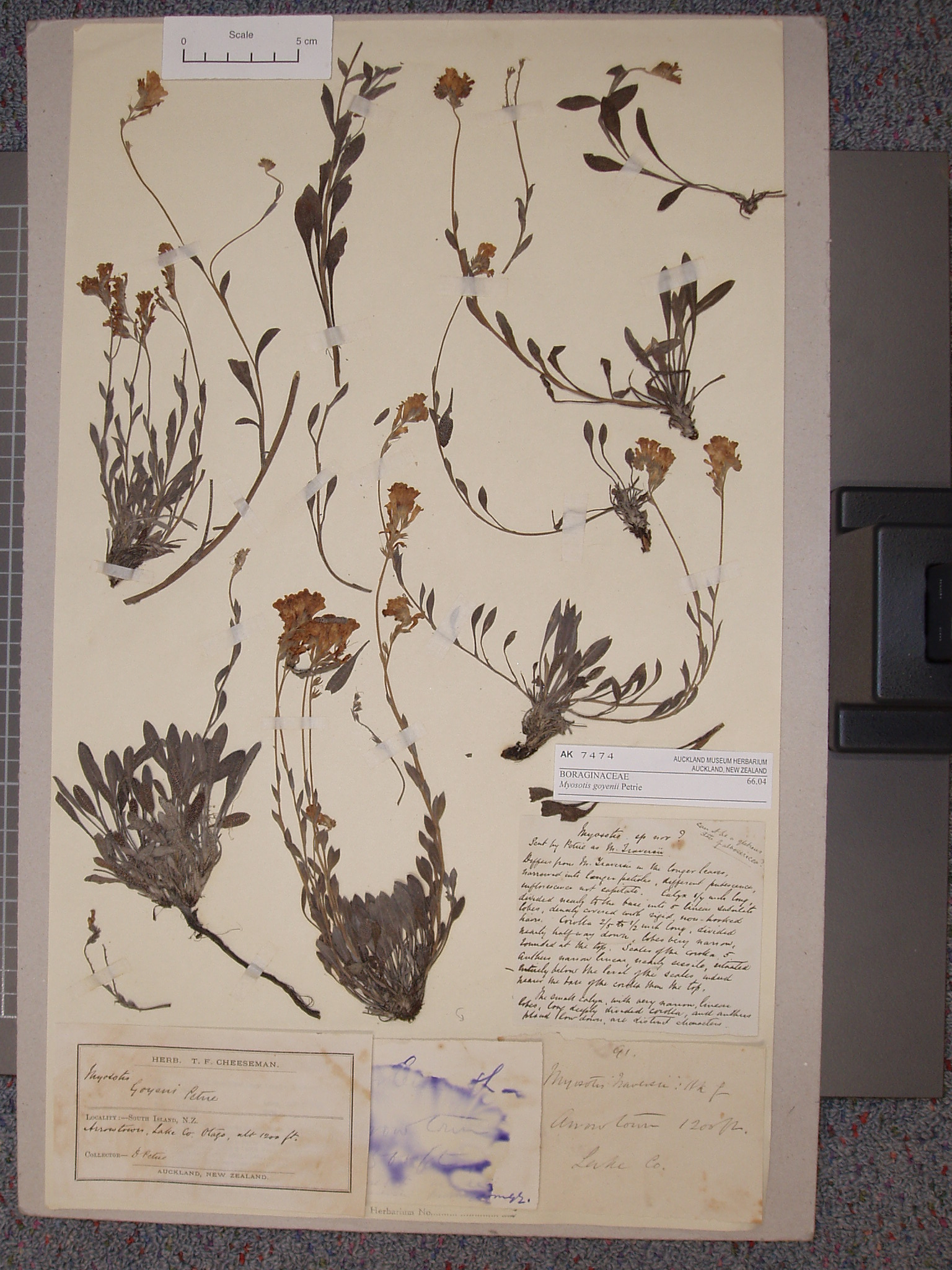
- Herbarium specimen of Myosotis goyenii subsp. goyenii

Conservation status
- Naturally Uncommon (NZ TCS)

Scientific classification
- Kingdom: Plantae
- Clade: Tracheophytes
- Clade: Angiosperms
- Clade: Eudicots
- Clade: Asterids
- Order: Boraginales
- Family: Boraginaceae
- Genus: Myosotis
- Species: M. goyenii
- Subspecies: M. g. subsp. goyenii

Trinomial name
- Myosotis goyenii subsp. goyenii Petrie

= Myosotis goyenii subsp. goyenii =

Species of flowering plant

Myosotis goyenii subsp. goyenii is a subspecies of flowering plant in the family Boraginaceae, endemic to southern South Island of New Zealand. Donald Petrie described the species M. goyenii in 1891. Plants of this subspecies of forget-me-not are perennial rosettes which form loose clumps, with ebracteate, erect inflorescences, and white corollas with partly exserted stamens.

== Taxonomy and etymology ==
Myosotis goyenii Petrie subsp. goyenii is in the plant family Boraginaceae. The species M. goyenii was described by Donald Petrie in 1891.

Multiple specimens of original material (syntypes) of Myosotis goyenii were collected in different localities in Otago, New Zealand by Peter Goyen (from Arrowtown) and Donald Petrie (from the Cardrona Valley and Lake Hawea). The lectotype was designated by Carlos Lehnebach, and is lodged at the herbarium of the Museum of New Zealand Te Papa Tongarewa (WELT SP002484).

Donald Petrie gave this species the specific epithet, goyenii, to honor his friend, Peter Goyen (1845–1927), who collected several specimens of M. goyenii. Like Petrie himself, Goyen was a school inspector and naturalist who lived on the South Island of New Zealand.

This is one of two subspecies recognized in Myosotis goyenii; the other is M. goyenii subsp. infima. The subspecies are allopatric, with M. goyenii subsp. goyenii occupying schist substrates in Southland and Otago, and M. goyenii subsp. infima found on limestone and calcareous substrates in Marlborough and Canterbury.

Myosotis goyenii subsp. goyenii can be distinguished from M. goyenii subsp. infima by its clumps of single rosettes that have a central woody taproot, and the following floral characteristics: a long style (> 6 mm), pistil that is 1.6–2.8× longer than the calyx, filaments attached < 1 mm below the scales, and anthers only partly included (with the tips equal to or just surpassing the scales). By contrast, M. goyenii subsp. infima plants form caespitose clumps of multiple rosettes that have fibrous roots, and have flowers with a short style (< 6 mm), pistil that is < 1.5× longer than the calyx, filaments attached > 1 mm below the faucal scales, and anthers fully included.

== Phylogeny ==
Myosotis goyenii was shown to be a part of the monophyletic southern hemisphere lineage of Myosotis in phylogenetic analyses of standard DNA sequencing markers (nuclear ribosomal DNA and chloroplast DNA regions). Within the southern hemisphere lineage, species relationships were not well resolved. Myosotis goyenii subsp. goyenii was included in one previous phylogenetic study. Of the three sequenced individuals of M. goyenii, the two from Otago (M. goyenii subsp. goyenii) grouped with each other and with M. albosericea in the nuclear ribosomal DNA analyses, and with M. australis and other species in the chloroplast DNA analyses.

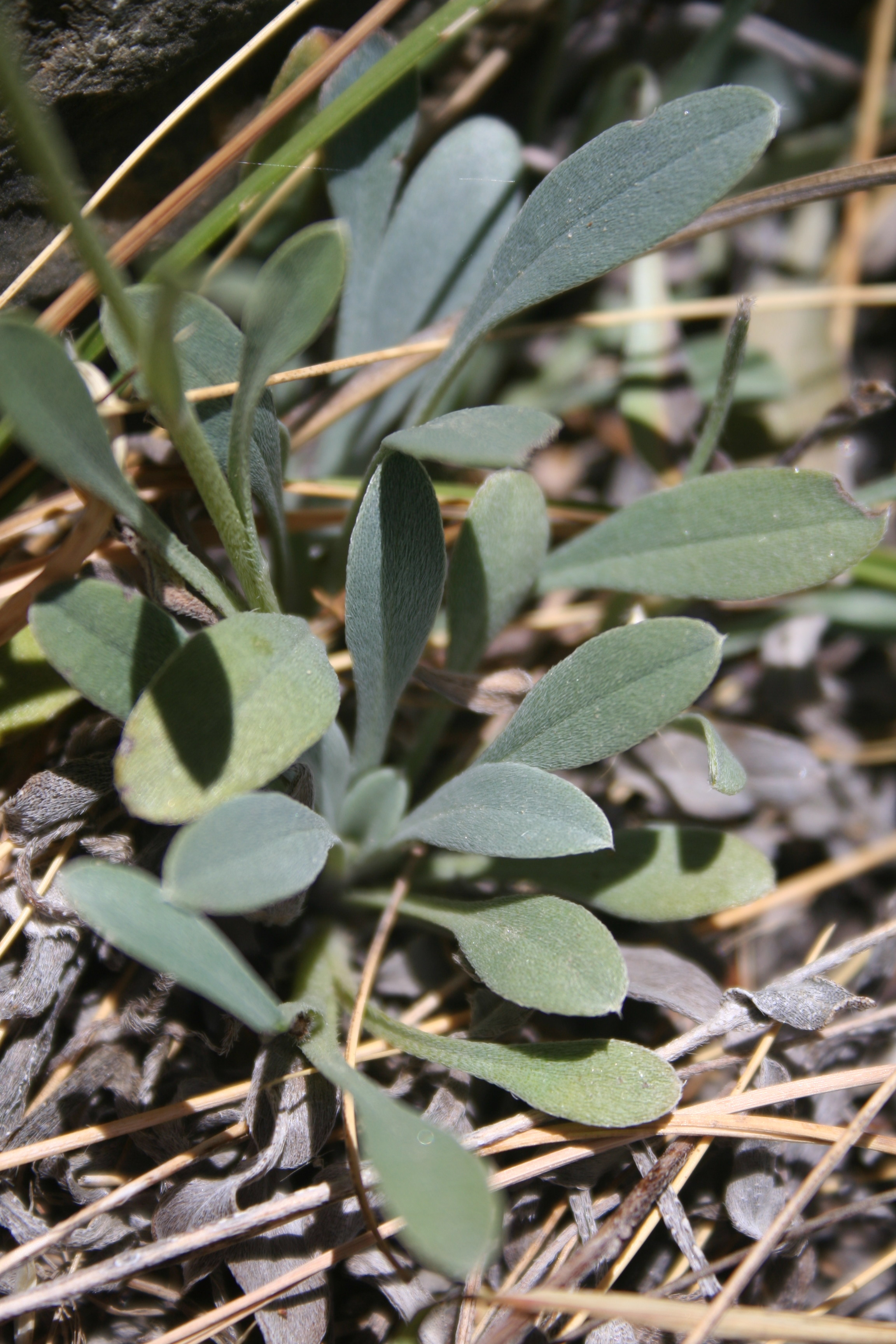
Rosette leaves

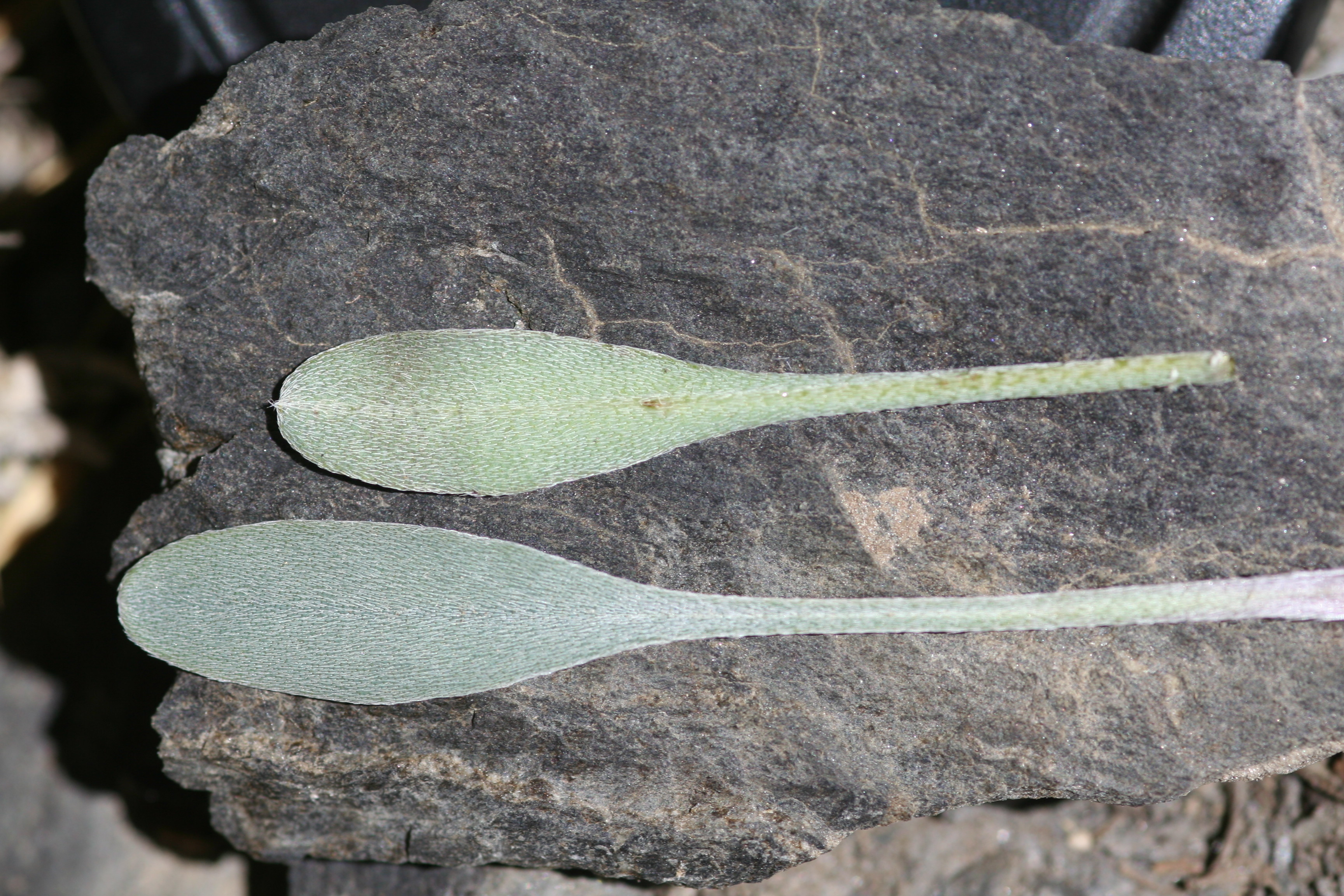
Detail of rosette leaves

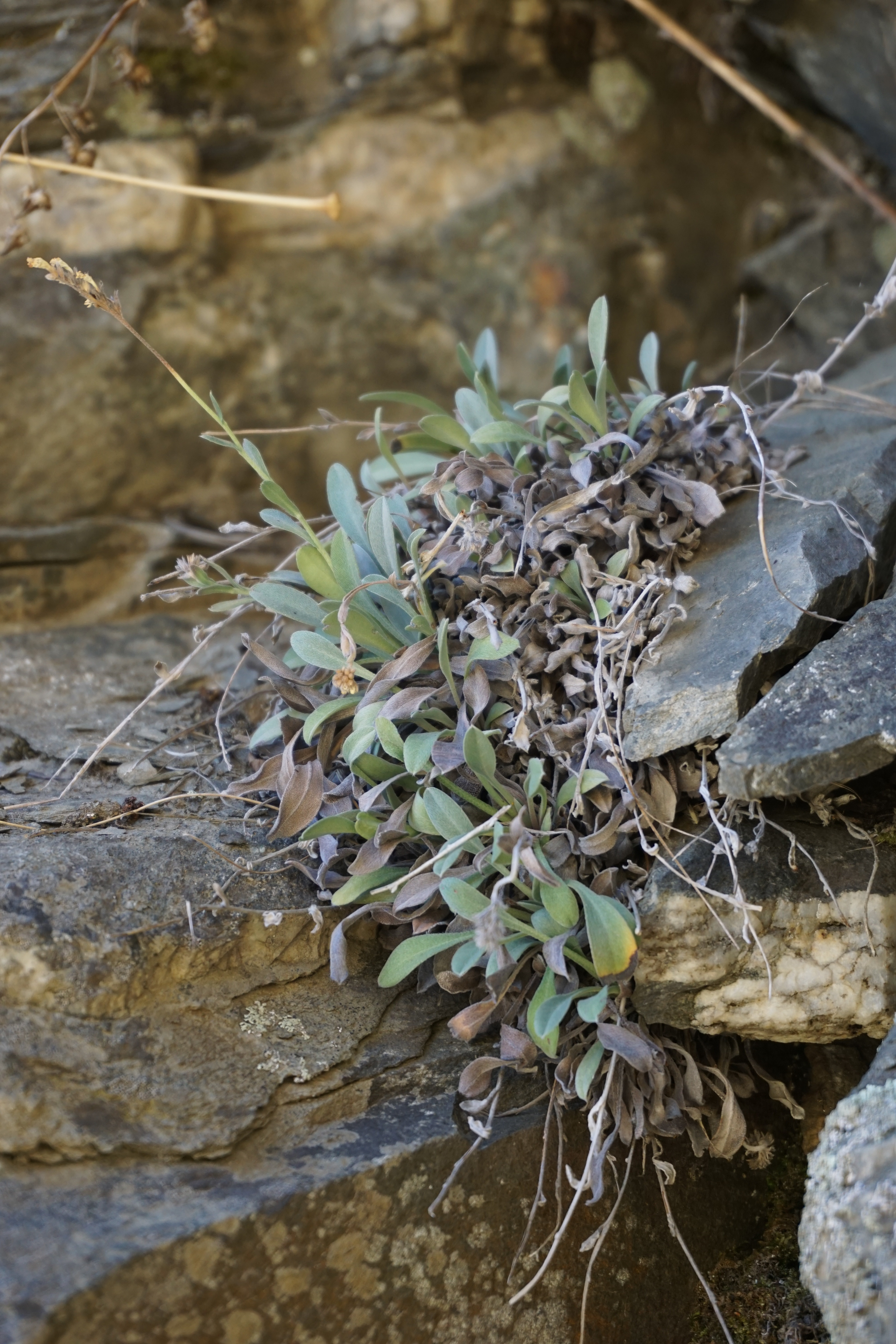
Growth habit

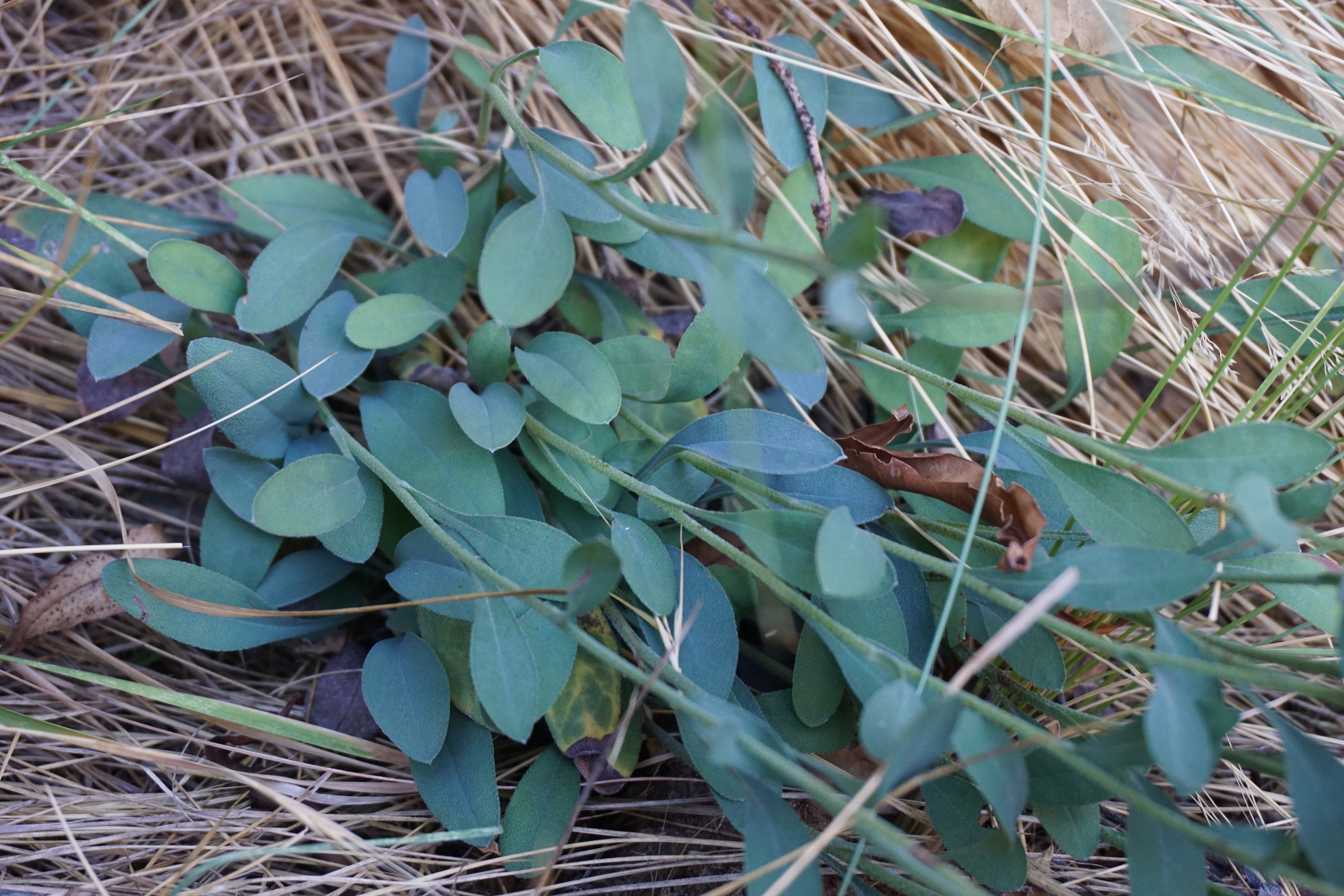
Leaves

== Description ==
Myosotis goyenii subsp. goyenii plants have long woody, branched taproots, and are single rosettes that often grow together to form loose clumps. The rosette leaves have petioles 10–48 mm long. The rosette leaf blades are 7–40 mm long by 3–11 mm wide (length: width ratio 2.2–5.3: 1), usually narrowly oblanceolate, oblanceolate or narrowly obovate, widest at or above the middle (rarely below the middle), with an acute apex (rarely obtuse). Both surfaces and the edges of the leaf are densely covered in straight, appressed, antrorse (forward-facing) hairs that are oriented parallel to the mid vein. Each rosette has 2–40 erect, usually once-branched (sometimes unbranched), ebracteate inflorescences that are up to 350 mm long and are usually bifurcating in an open, forked 'V' shape near the tips. The cauline leaves are up to 13 per inflorescence and are similar to the rosette leaves but smaller with shorter petioles, and decrease in size toward the tip. Each inflorescence has up to 26 flowers, each borne on a pedicel up to 1.3 mm long at fruiting, and each without a bract. The calyx is 3–5 mm long at flowering and 4–6 mm long at fruiting, lobed to half to almost all of its length, and densely covered in antrorse, straight to flexuous, appressed to patent hairs. The corolla is white, up to 14 mm in diameter, with a cylindrical tube, petals that are broadly ovate, obovate, broadly obovate or broadly obovate, and small yellow scales alternating with the petals. The stamens are 6.1–7.5 mm long (measured from the base of the calyx to the anther tips) with filaments 0.3–0.4 mm long that are attached to the corolla tube < 1 mm below the base of the scales. The anthers are partly exserted above the scales, with the anther tips equal to or just surpassing the scales. The pistil is 8–11 mm long with a style that is 7–10 mm long at fruiting. The four smooth, shiny, light to dark brown nutlets are 1.7–2.7 mm long by 1.0–1.3 mm wide and narrowly ovoid in shape.

The chromosome number of M. goyenii subsp. goyenii is unknown.

The pollen of M. goyenii subsp. goyenii is unknown.

It flowers and fruits from November–March, with the main flowering and fruiting period from December–February.

== Distribution and habitat ==
Myosotis goyenii subsp. goyenii is a forget-me-not endemic to Otago and Southland in the South Island of New Zealand, from 650 to 1300 m ASL. It is found on rock (schist) outcrops, ledges, cliffs and shingle.

== Conservation status ==
The species M. goyenii is listed as At Risk - Naturally Uncommon on the most recent assessment (2017–2018) under the New Zealand Threatened Classification system for plants, with the qualifier "Sp" (Sparse).
