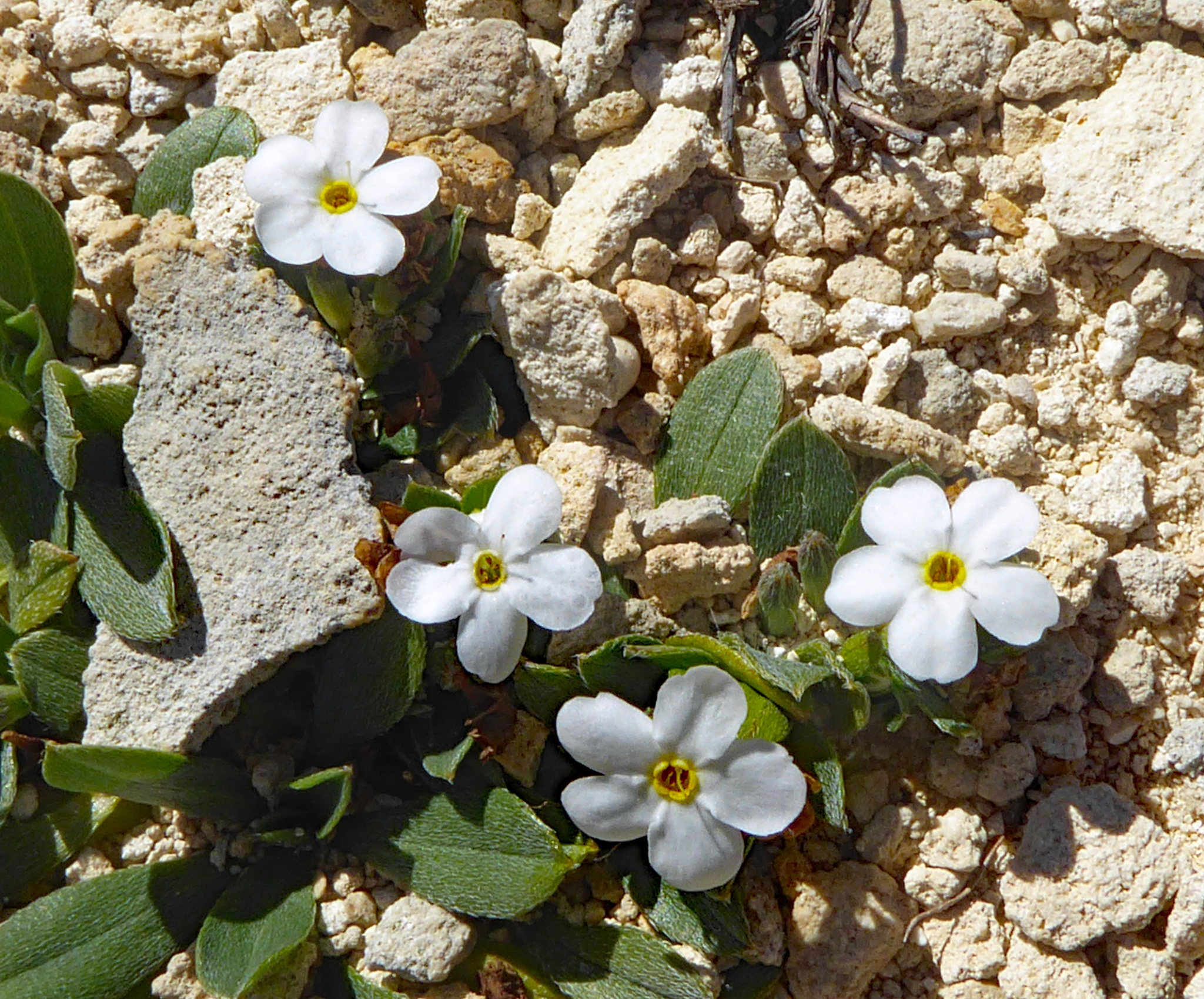

Conservation status
- Nationally Critical (NZ TCS)

Scientific classification
- Kingdom: Plantae
- Clade: Embryophytes
- Clade: Tracheophytes
- Clade: Angiosperms
- Clade: Eudicots
- Clade: Asterids
- Order: Boraginales
- Family: Boraginaceae
- Genus: Myosotis
- Species: M. colensoi

Binomial name
- Myosotis colensoi (Kirk) J.F.Macbr.

= Myosotis colensoi =

Species of flowering plant

Myosotis colensoi is a species of flowering plant in the family Boraginaceae, endemic to the South Island of New Zealand. Thomas Kirk described the species in 1896. Plants of this species of forget-me-not are perennial rosettes with bracteate inflorescences and white corollas.

== Taxonomy and etymology ==
Myosotis colensoi (Kirk) J.F.Macbr. is in the plant family Boraginaceae and was originally described (as Exarrhena colensoi Kirk) in 1896 by Thomas Kirk. M colensoi is morphologically most similar to M. cheesemanii, from which it can be distinguished by its rosette laminas which are longer (> 6.8 mm) with a larger length : width ratio (2.2–3.1 : 1), shorter petioles, and larger rosettes.

The type specimen of Myosotis colensoi is lodged at the Museum of New Zealand Te Papa Tongarewa, Wellington (herbarium WELT).

The specific epithet, colensoi, is named after New Zealand missionary and botanist, William Colenso 1811–1899).

== Phylogeny ==
Myosotis colensoi was shown to be a part of the monophyletic southern hemisphere lineage of Myosotis in phylogenetic analyses of standard DNA sequencing markers (nuclear ribosomal DNA and chloroplast DNA regions). Within the southern hemisphere lineage, species relationships were not well resolved.

== Description ==
Myosotis colensoi plants are single rosettes that grow close together forming loose clumps. The rosette leaves have petioles 2–16 mm long. The rosette leaf blades are 4–15 mm long by 0.6–2 mm wide (length: width ratio 2.2–3.8: 1), oblanceolate to narrowly obovate or rarely narrowly elliptic to elliptic, widest at or above the middle, with an obtuse and often retuse apex. The upper surface of the leaf is densely covered in straight, mostly appressed, antrorse (forward-facing) hairs that are parallel to the mid vein, while on the lower surface the hairs are the same but often only a few isolated hairs are present. Each rosette has 3–13 prostrate, unbranched, bracteate inflorescences that are (14)32–76 mm long. The cauline leaves on the lower part of the inflorescence are similar to but smaller than the rosette leaves, but usually sparsely to densely hairy on the lower surface, and decrease in size and become sessile toward the tip. There can be up to 12 flowers in each inflorescence, each one borne on a short pedicel and with a bract. The calyx is 3–7 mm long at flowering and 4–8 mm long at fruiting, lobed to about a third of its length, and densely covered in short, straight, appressed to patent, antrorse hairs. The corolla is white up to 9 mm in diameter, with a cylindrical tube, petals that are obovate to very broadly broadly obovate and flat, and small yellow scales alternating with the petals. The anthers are partially exserted, with the tips only surpassing the scales. The four smooth, shiny, medium brown nutlets are 1.3–1.8 mm long by 0.8–1.1 mm wide and ovoid (rarely narrowly ovoid) in shape.

Myosotis colensoi has M. australis type pollen.

The chromosome number of M. colensoi is 2n = 46 (CHR100916). The breeding system of Myosotis colensoi is outcrossing, as the flowers are 'always herkogamous', with a high pollen : ovule ratio, and no seed production in enclosed flowers. Nevertheless, the species is also fully self-compatible.

Myosotis colensoi flowers and fruits from (September–)November–January(–April).

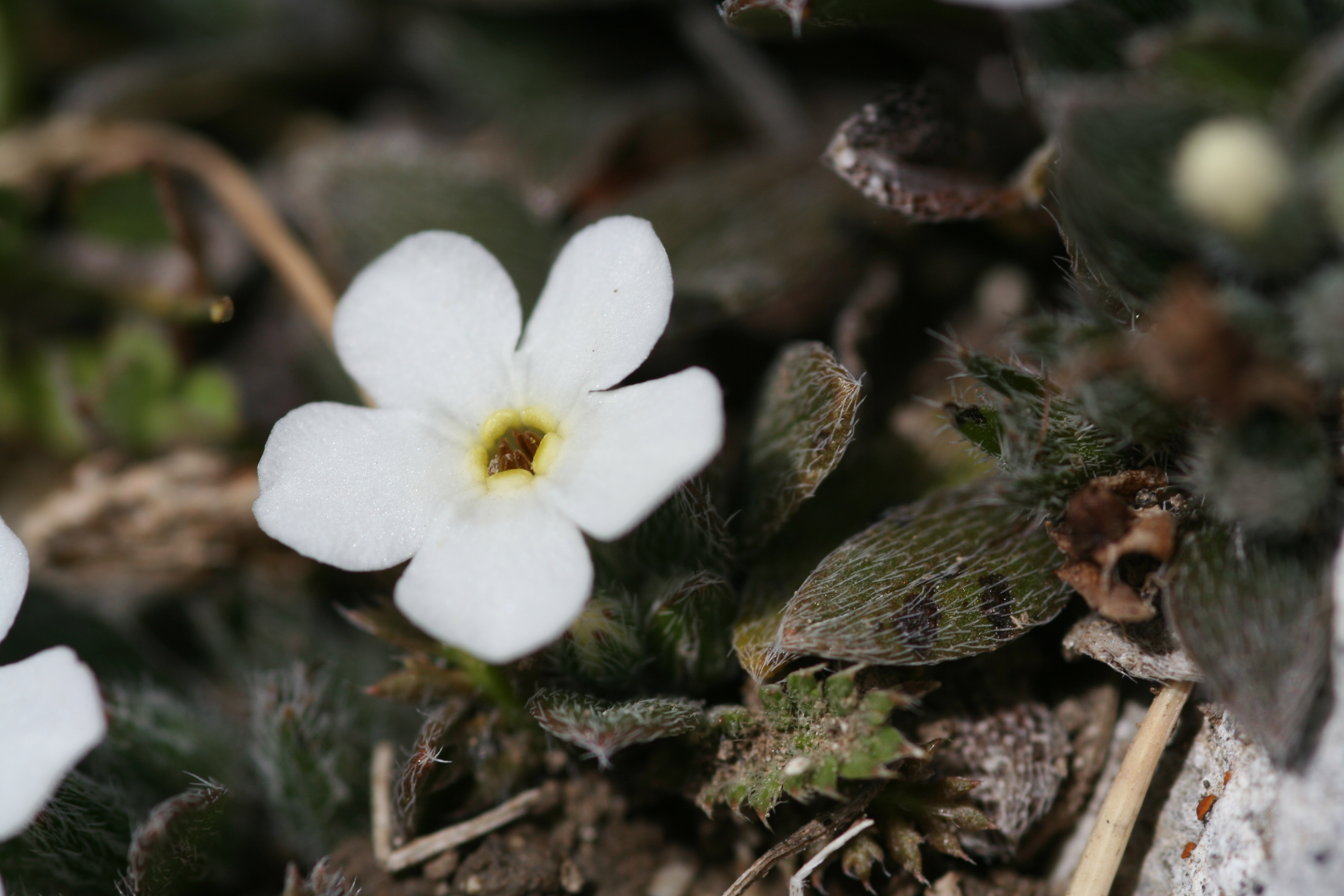
Floral detail

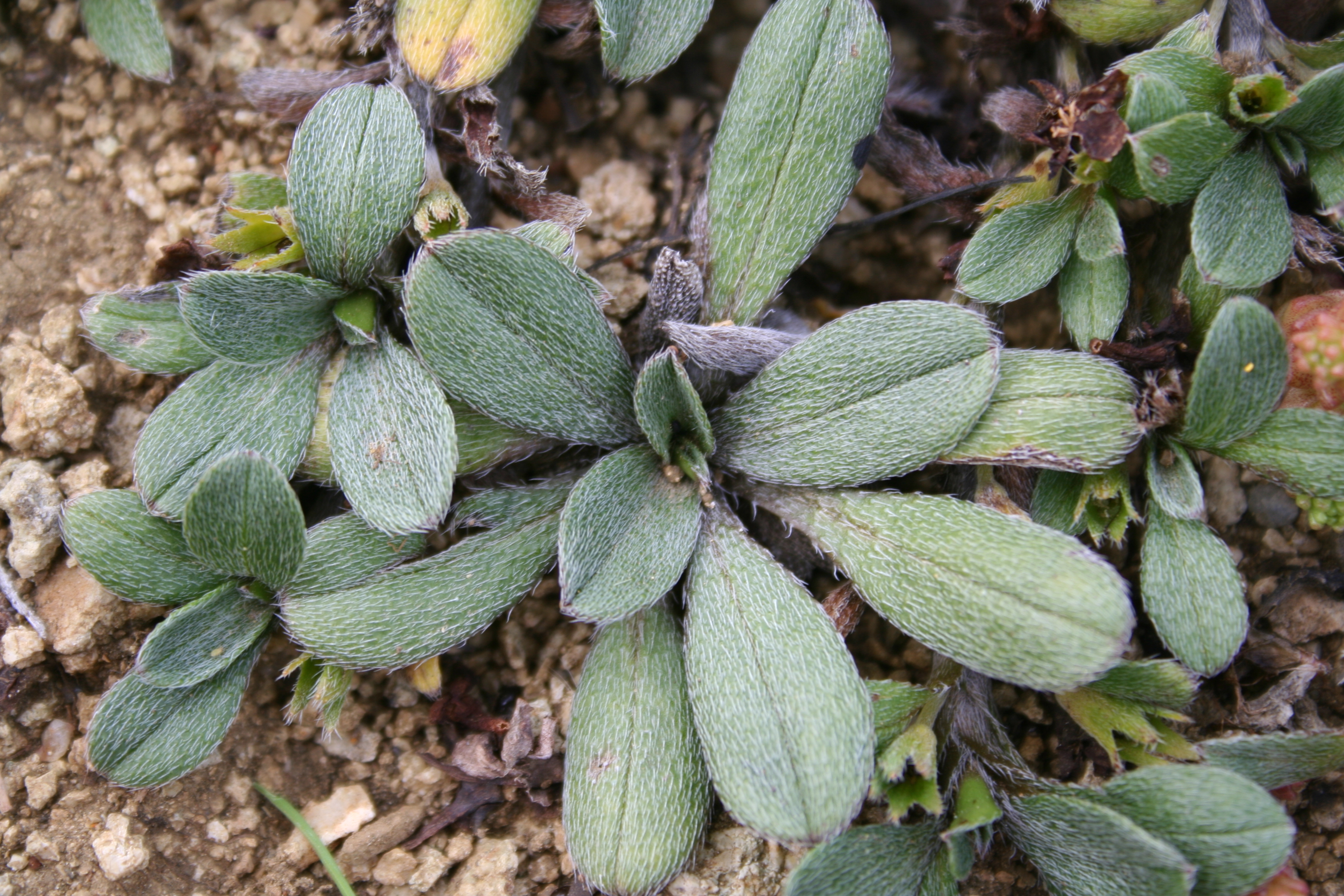
Rosette leaves

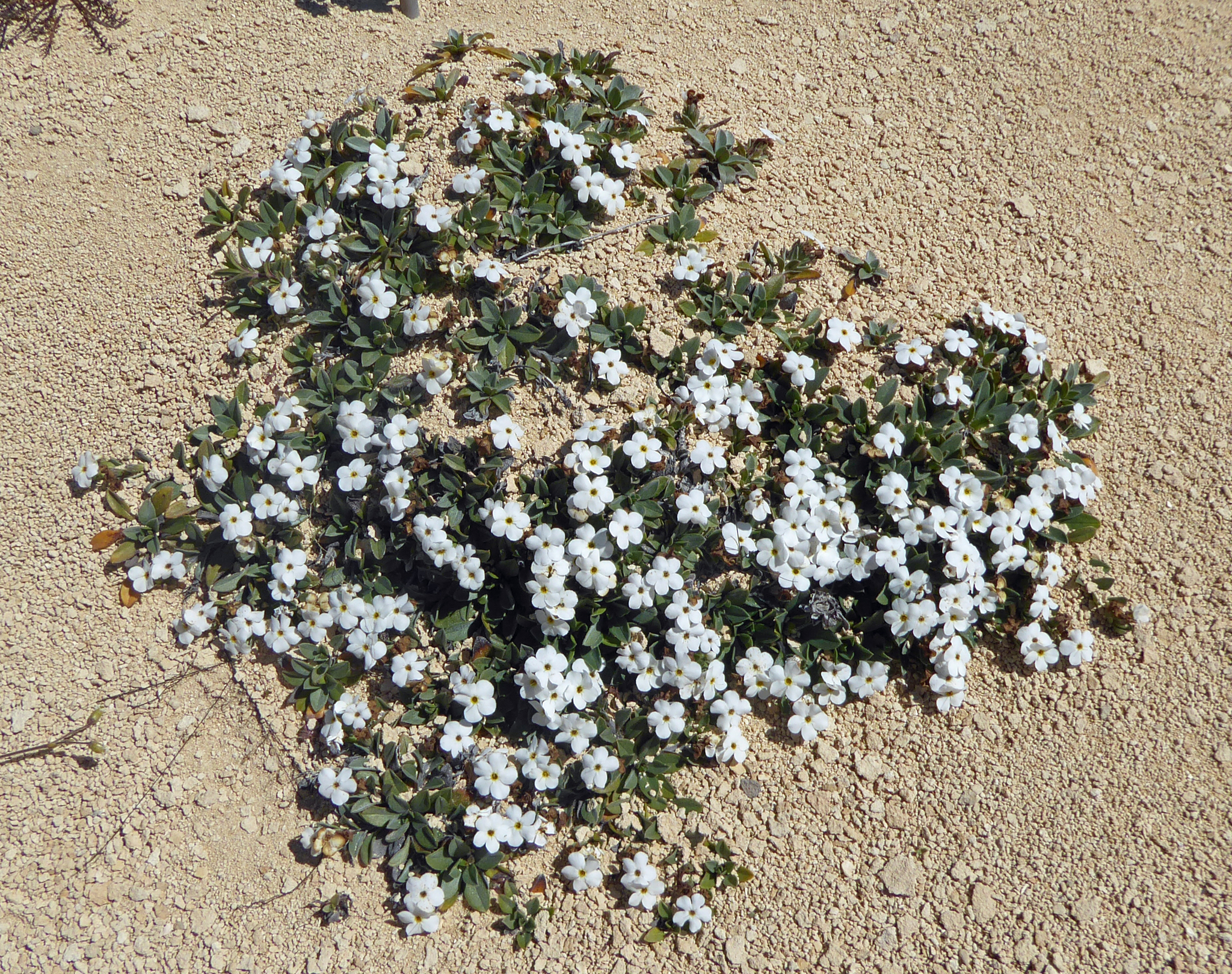
Large flowering plant

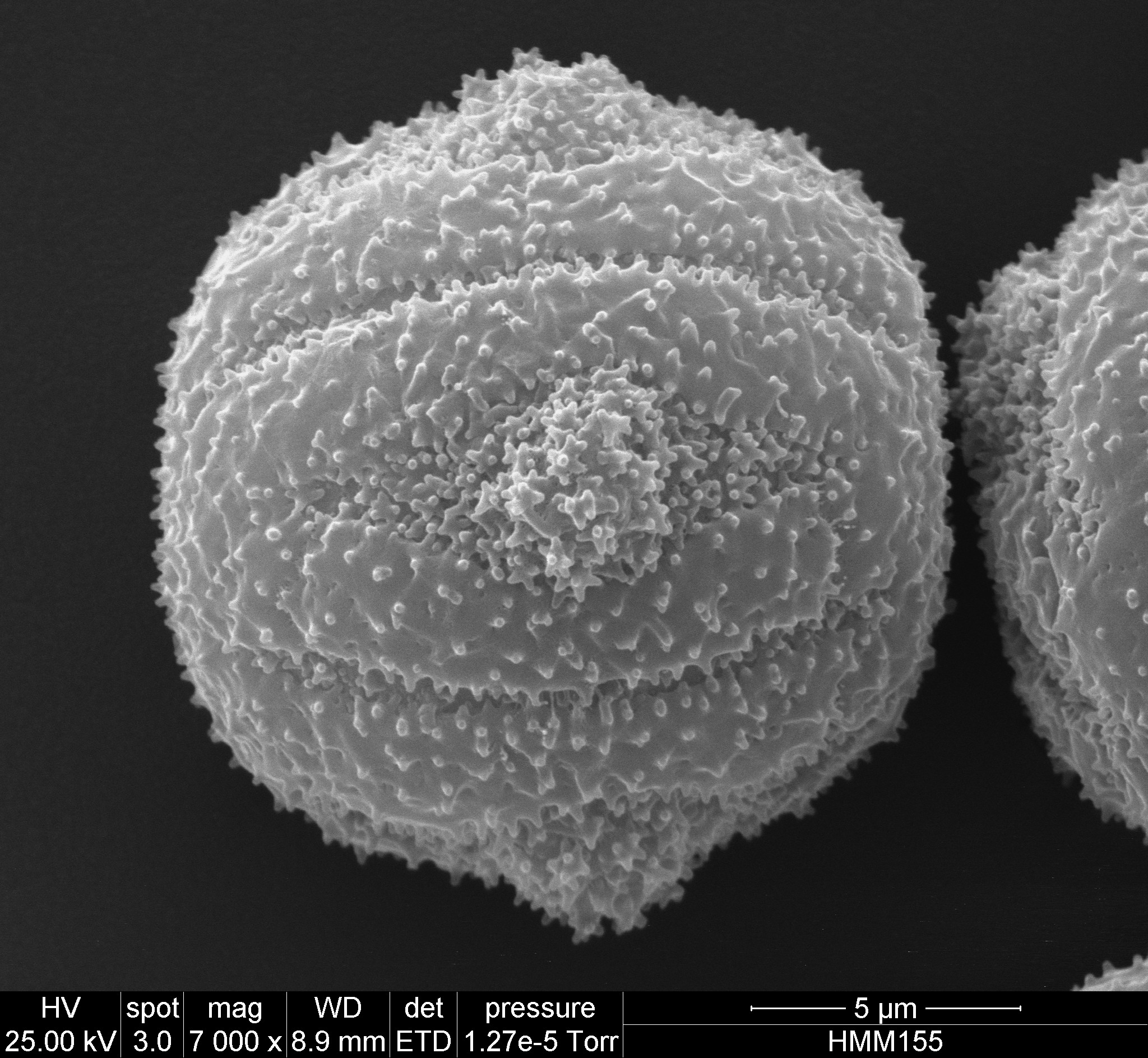
Pollen grain

== Distribution and habitat ==
Myosotis colensoi is endemic to the South Island of New Zealand in Marlborough (Chalk Range) and Canterbury (Castle Hill area), from 610–1050 m ASL. M. colensoi is found on dry, exposed limestone. In Canterbury, it may be found with the Castle Hill buttercup, Ranunculus paucifolius. It is considered to be an obligate calcicole.

== Conservation status ==
The species is listed as Threatened - Nationally Critical in the most recent assessment (2017-2018) of the New Zealand Threatened Classification for plants. It also has the qualifiers "RR" (Sparse) and "Sp" (Sparse).
