= Ranunculus paucifolius =

Scientific classification
- Kingdom: Plantae
- Clade: Tracheophytes
- Clade: Angiosperms
- Clade: Eudicots
- Order: Ranunculales
- Family: Ranunculaceae
- Genus: Ranunculus
- Species: R. paucifolius

Binomial name
- Ranunculus paucifolius Kirk

Species of buttercup

Ranunculus paucifolius, commonly known as the Castlehill buttercup, is an endangered species of buttercup native to New Zealand.
