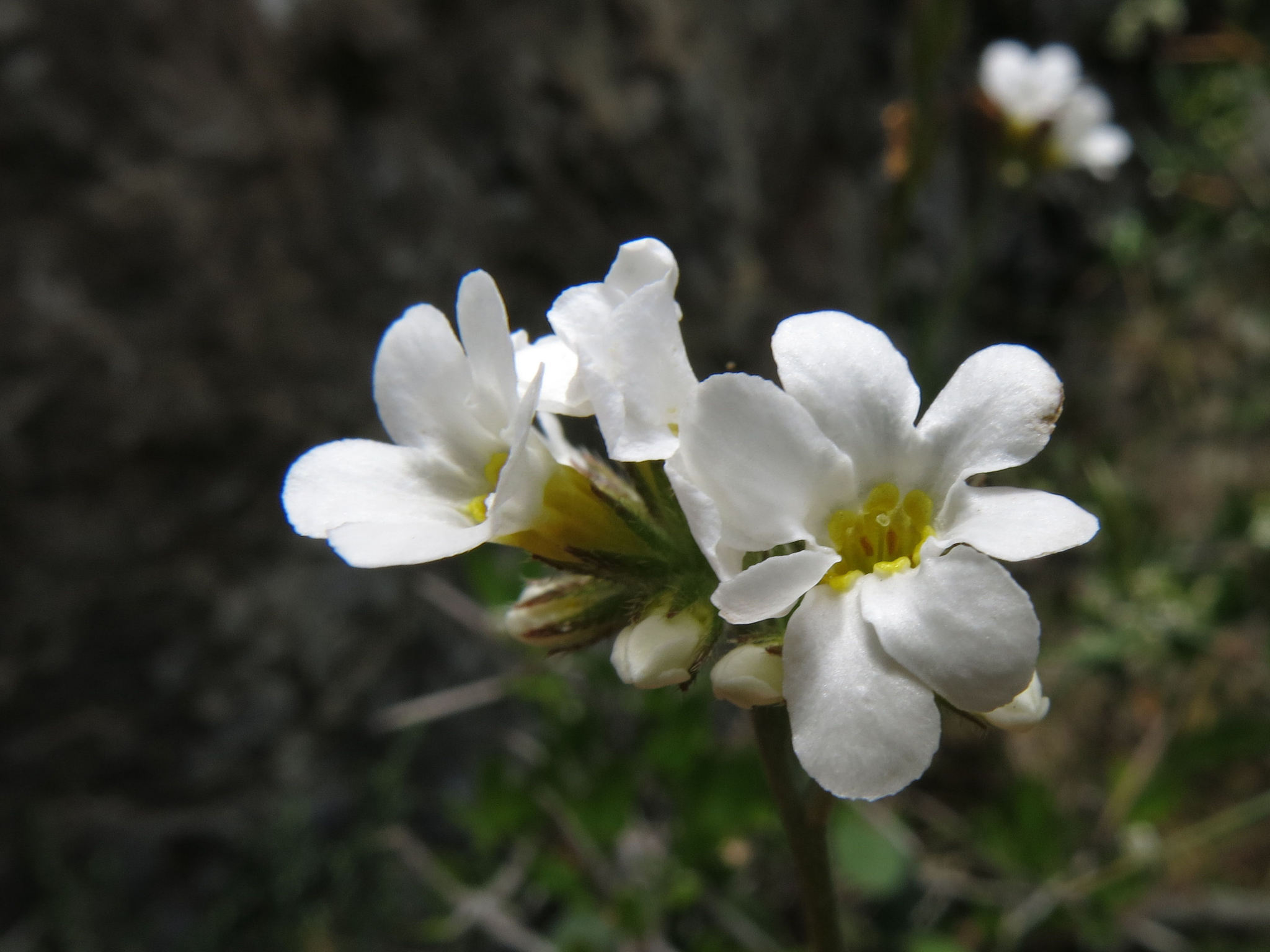
- Flowers of Myosotis goyenii

Conservation status
- Naturally Uncommon (NZ TCS)

Scientific classification
- Kingdom: Plantae
- Clade: Tracheophytes
- Clade: Angiosperms
- Clade: Eudicots
- Clade: Asterids
- Order: Boraginales
- Family: Boraginaceae
- Genus: Myosotis
- Species: M. goyenii

Binomial name
- Myosotis goyenii Petrie

= Myosotis goyenii =

Species of flowering plant

Myosotis goyenii is a species of flowering plant in the family Boraginaceae, endemic to the South Island of New Zealand. Donald Petrie described the species in 1891. Plants of this species of forget-me-not are perennial rosettes which form loose tufts or clumps, with ebracteate, erect inflorescences, and white corollas with partly exserted or fully included stamens.

== Taxonomy and etymology ==
Myosotis goyenii Petrie is in the plant family Boraginaceae and was described by Donald Petrie in 1891.

Myosotis goyenii is morphologically similar to other ebracteate-erect species, especially other South Island endemic species M. albosericea, M. monroi and M. × cinerascens. Plants of these species have densely distributed hairs on the rosette leaves that are antrorse (forward-facing), straight, appressed and parallel to the mid vein, short fruiting pedicels, and no retrorse (backward-facing) hairs on the leaves or calyx. M. goyenii can be distinguished from these species by its longer inflorescences and the glaucous, grey or grey–blue color of most of its vegetative parts.

Multiple specimens of original material (syntypes) of Myosotis goyenii were collected in different localities in Otago, New Zealand by Peter Goyen (from Arrowtown) and Donald Petrie (from the Cardrona Valley and Lake Hawea). The lectotype was designated by Carlos Lehnebach, and is lodged at the herbarium of the Museum of New Zealand Te Papa Tongarewa (WELT SP002484).

Donald Petrie gave this species the specific epithet goyenii to honor his friend, Peter Goyen (1845–1927), who collected several specimens of it. Like Petrie himself, Goyen was a school inspector and naturalist who lived on the South Island of New Zealand.

Two subspecies are recognized: Myosotis goyenii subsp. goyenii and M. goyenii subsp. infima. The subspecies are allopatric, and can be distinguished from one another based on habit; length of the style, pistil and filaments; and anther exsertion.

== Phylogeny ==
Myosotis goyenii was shown to be a part of the monophyletic southern hemisphere lineage of Myosotis in phylogenetic analyses of standard DNA sequencing markers (nuclear ribosomal DNA and chloroplast DNA regions). Within the southern hemisphere lineage, species relationships were not well resolved. The two sequenced individuals of M. goyenii grouped with each other and with M. albosericea in the nuclear ribosomal DNA analyses, and with M. australis and other species in the chloroplast DNA analyses.

== Description ==
Myosotis goyenii plants have long woody taproots or fibrous roots, and are single rosettes that often grow together to form loose clumps or tufts. The rosette leaves have petioles 10–48 mm long. The rosette leaf blades are 7–40 mm long by 3–11 mm wide (length: width ratio 2.2–5.3: 1), usually narrowly oblanceolate, oblanceolate or narrowly obovate, widest at or above the middle (rarely below the middle), with an acute apex (rarely obtuse). Both surfaces and the edges of the leaf are densely covered in straight, appressed, antrorse (forward-facing) hairs that are oriented parallel to the mid vein. Each rosette has 2–40 erect, usually once-branched (sometimes unbranched), ebracteate inflorescences that are up to 350 mm long and are usually bifurcating in an open, forked 'V' shape near the tips. The cauline leaves are similar to the rosette leaves but smaller with shorter petioles, and decrease in size toward the tip. Each inflorescence has up to 26 flowers, each borne on a pedicel up to 3 mm long at fruiting, and each without a bract. The calyx is 3–5 mm long at flowering and 4–6 mm long at fruiting, lobed to half to almost all of its length, and densely covered in antrorse, straight to flexuous, appressed to patent hairs. The corolla is white, up to 14 mm in diameter, with a cylindrical tube, petals that are broadly ovate, obovate, broadly obovate or broadly obovate, and small yellow scales alternating with the petals. The anthers are partly exserted above the scales or fully included within the tube. The four smooth, shiny, light to dark brown nutlets are 1.7–2.7 mm long by 1.0–1.3 mm wide and narrowly ovoid in shape.

The chromosome number of M. goyenii is unknown.

The pollen of M. goyenii is unknown.

It flowers and fruits from October–June, with the main flowering and fruiting period from January–February.

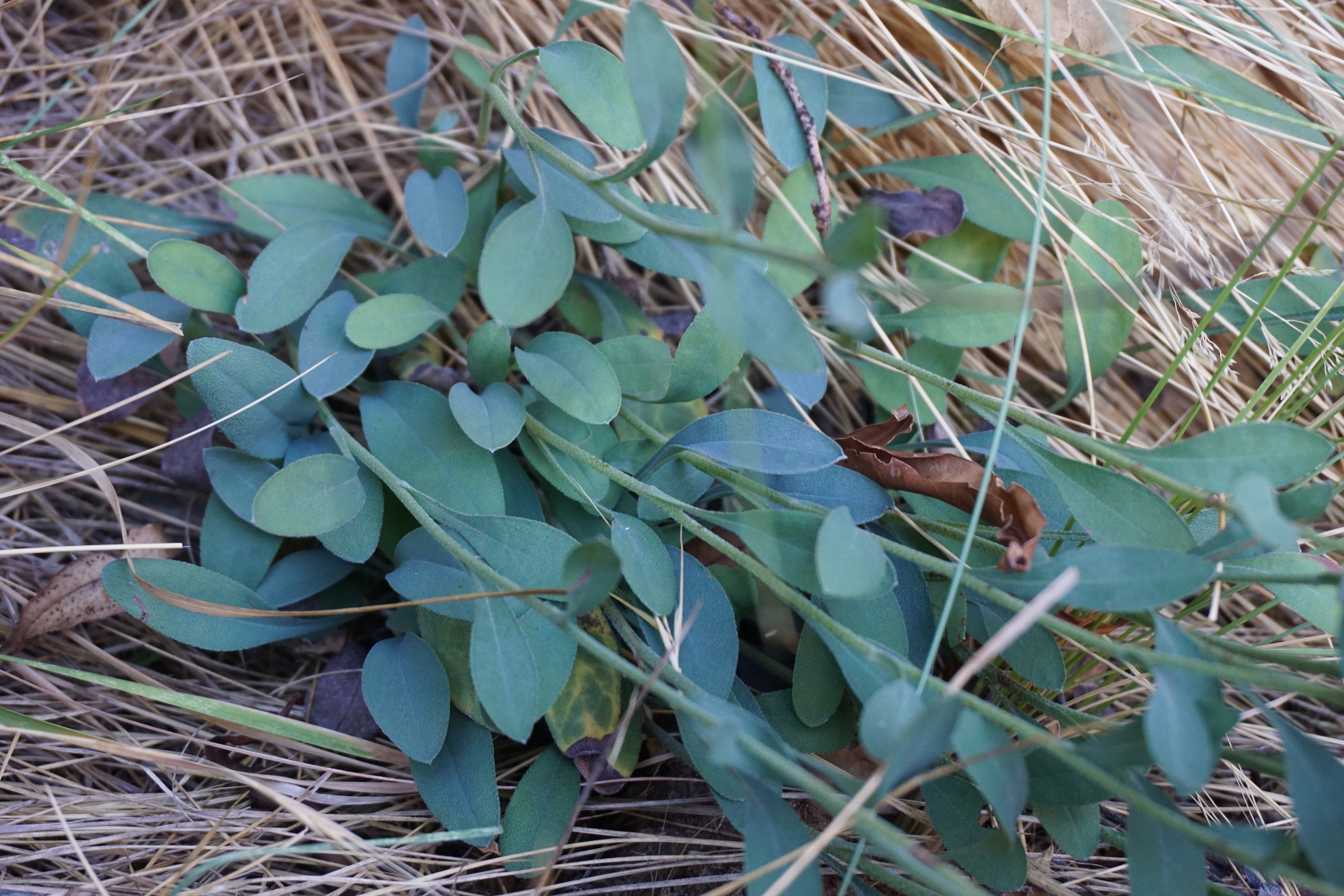
Leaves of subsp. goyenii

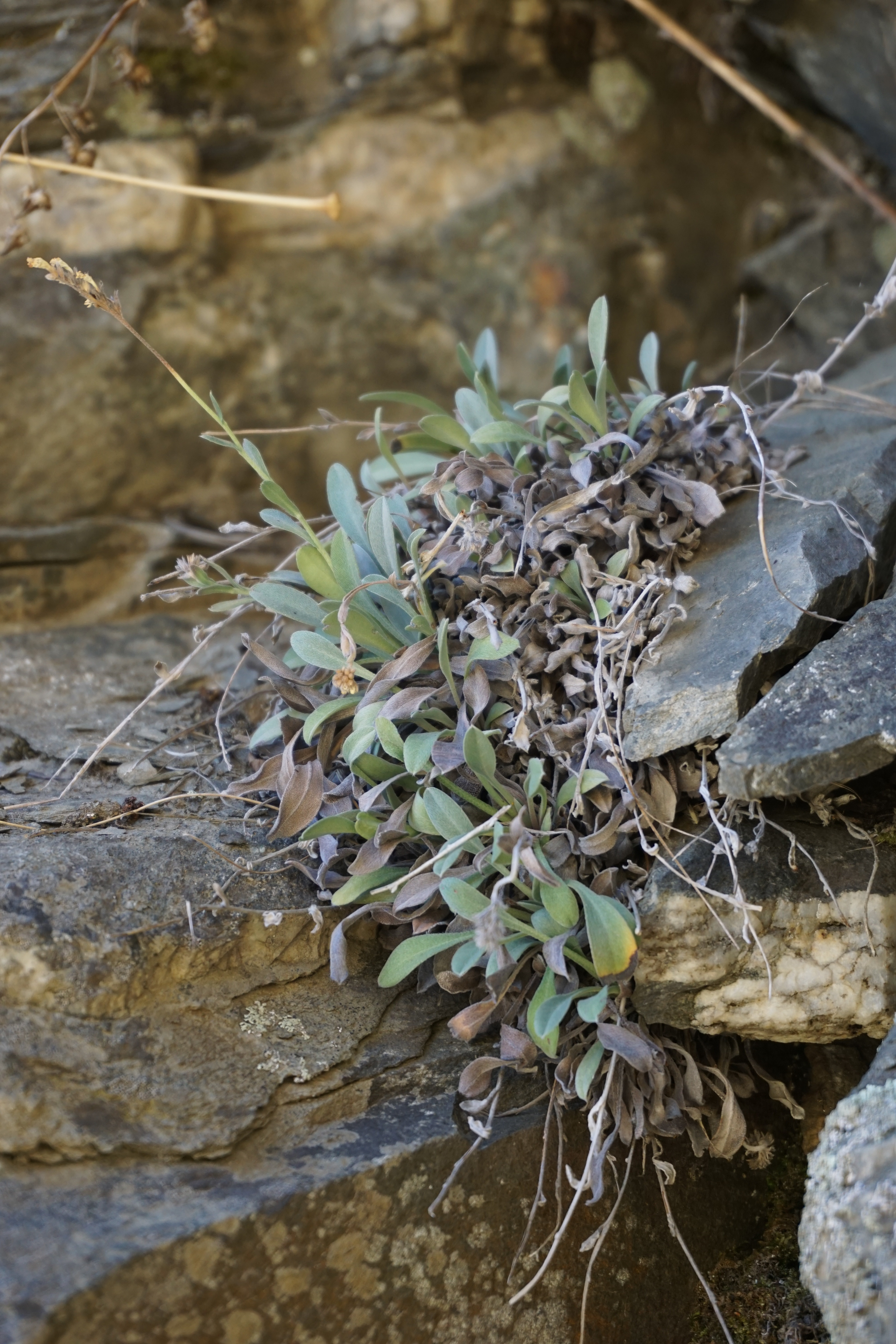
Growth habit of subsp. goyenii

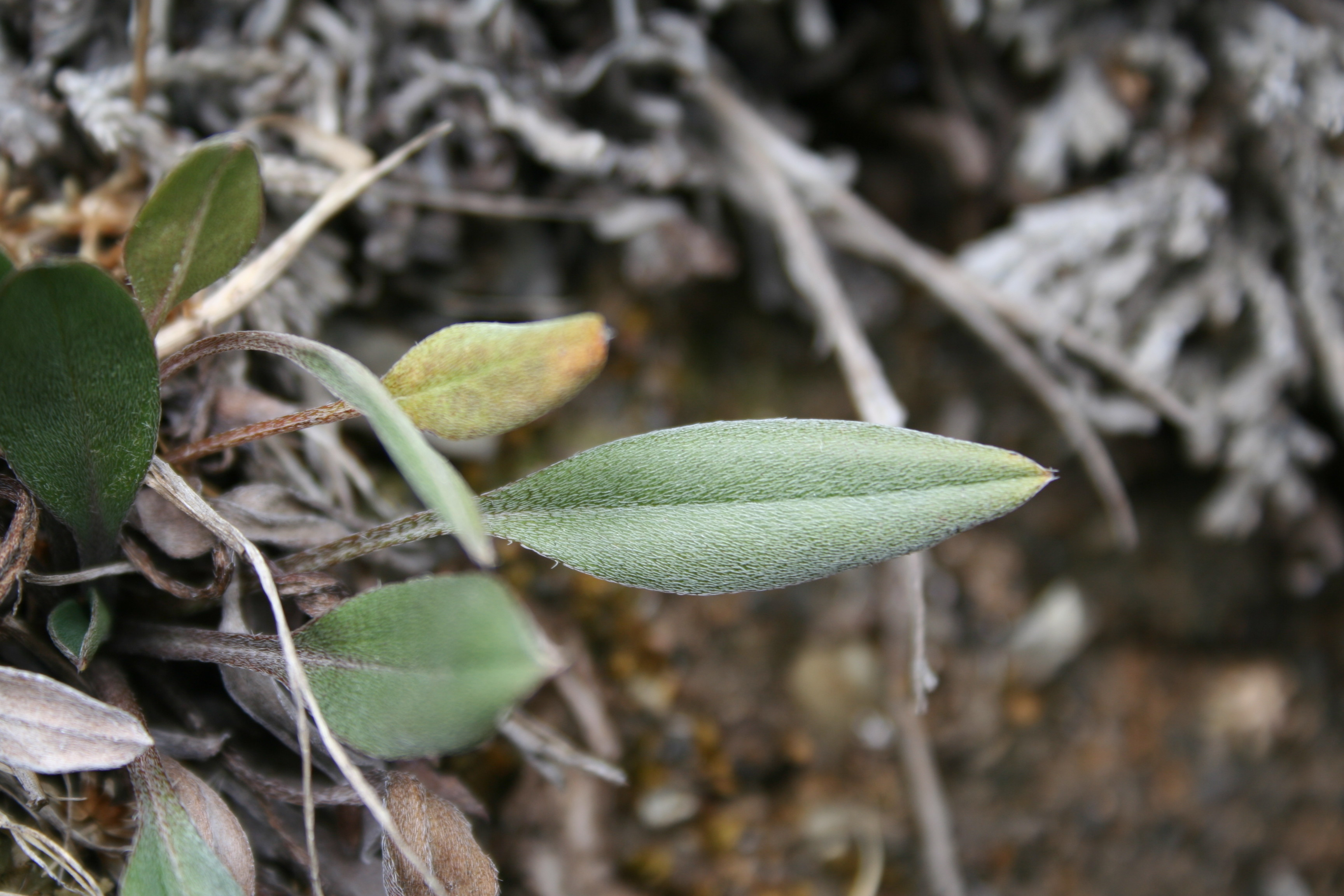
Leaf of subsp. infima

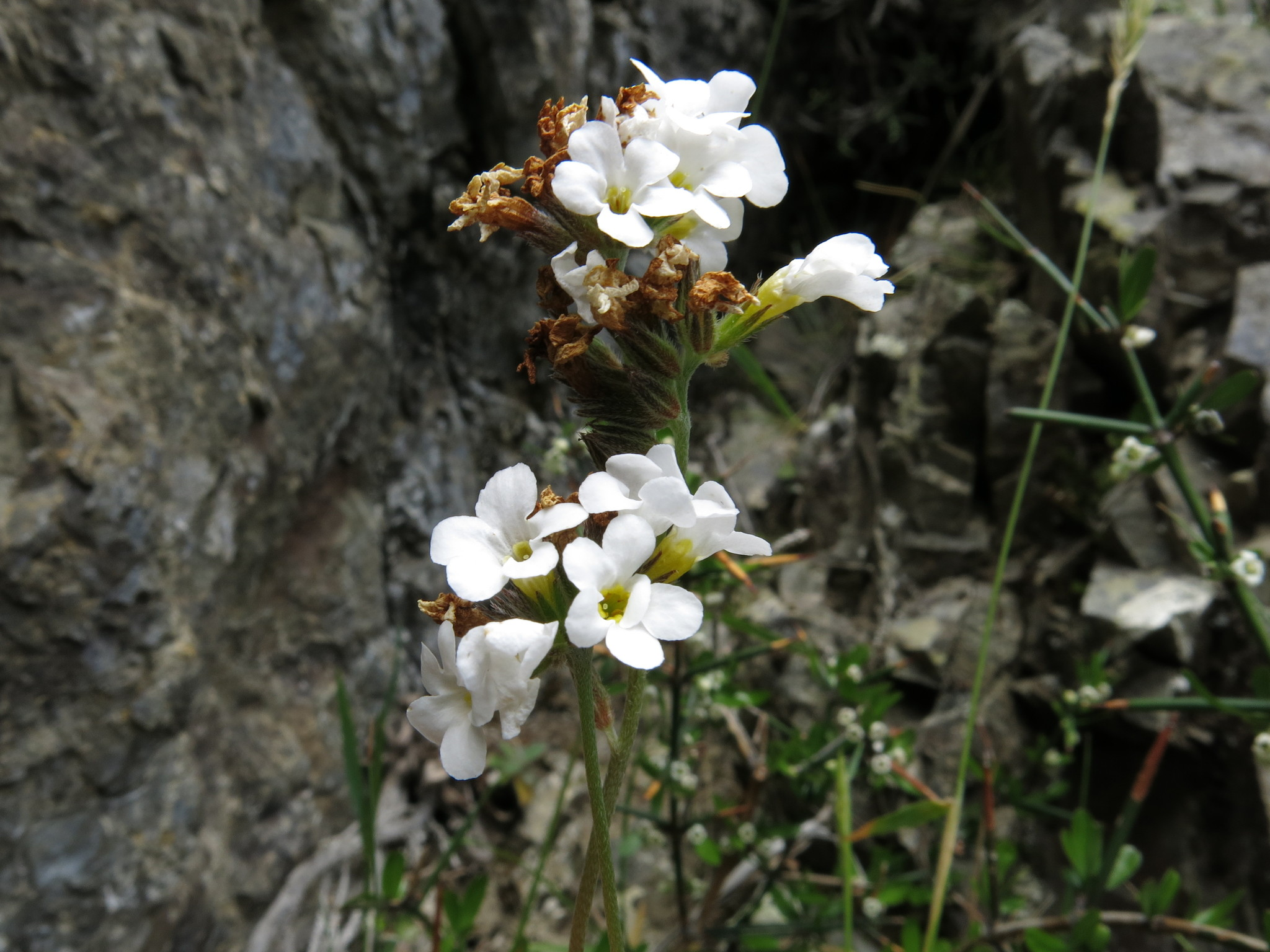
Flowers of subsp. infima

== Distribution and habitat ==
Myosotis goyenii is a forget-me-not endemic to two disjunct areas in the South Island, New Zealand, i.e. Marlborough and Canterbury in the north, and Otago and Southland in the south, from 450–1300 m ASL. It is found on steep slopes, rock outcrops and ledges, on schist or limestone substrates.

== Conservation status ==
The species is listed as At Risk - Naturally Uncommon on the most recent assessment (2017-2018) under the New Zealand Threatened Classification system for plants, with the qualifier "Sp" (Sparse).
