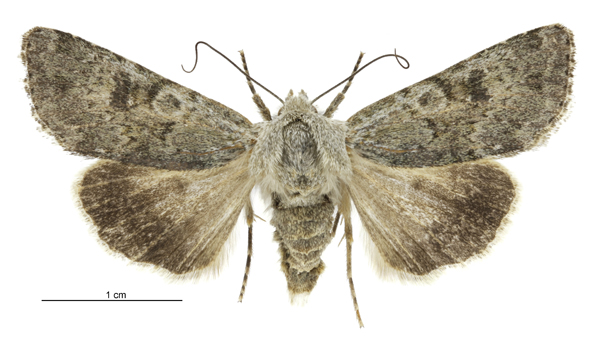
- Female
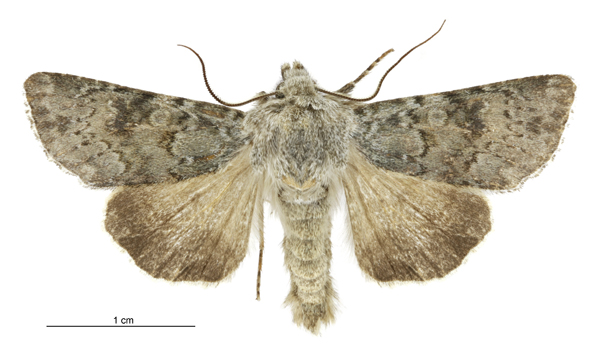
- Male

Scientific classification
- Kingdom: Animalia
- Phylum: Arthropoda
- Clade: Pancrustacea
- Class: Insecta
- Order: Lepidoptera
- Superfamily: Noctuoidea
- Family: Noctuidae
- Genus: Ichneutica
- Species: I. cuneata

Binomial name
- Ichneutica cuneata (Philpott, 1916)

Synonyms
- Aletia cuneata Philpott,1916; Aletia s.l. cuneata (Philpott, 1916); Aletia dentata Philpott, 1923; Mythimna cuneata (Philpott, 1916); Mythimna dentata (Philpott, 1923); Aletia s.l. dentata (Philpott, 1923)

= Ichneutica cuneata =

Species of moth

Ichneutica cuneata is a moth in the family Noctuidae. It is endemic to New Zealand. I. cuneata is found in and around the Tongariro National Park in the North Island and throughout the South Island. Specimens found in Tongariro National Park tend to be darker in appearance than South Island specimens but as their colour is variable, and antennae and genitalia of both species are consistent, they are not now regarded as a separate species. I. cuneata inhabits tussock grasslands and shrublands in alpine and subalpine zones. The adults are on the wing from December to April and can be found flying during the day. The life history of I. cuneata is unknown as are the specific host species of its larvae. However larvae of I. cuneata are said to feed on herbaceous plants. The adults of this species also pollinate native species such as Myosotis macrantha.

== Taxonomy ==
The species was first described by Alfred Philpott in 1916 from specimens obtained at Ben Lomond and Macetown. Philpott named the species Aletia cuneata. The lectotype specimen, collected at Ben Lomond in January, is held in the New Zealand Arthropod Collection. In 1988 J. S. Dugdale, in his catalogue on New Zealand Lepidoptera, placed this species within the Aletia genus. In 2019 Robert Hoare undertook a major review of New Zealand Noctuidae species. During this review the genus Ichneutica was greatly expanded and the genus Aletia was subsumed into that genus as a synonym. As a result of this review, this species is now known as Ichneutica cuneata. Hoare, while undertaking the review, also inspected the type material of Aletia dentata. Hoare placed this species within the genus Ichneutica and subsumed it as a synonym of Ichneutica cuneata. Hoare justified this action by explaining that although the moths formerly regarded as a separate species tend to be darker, this colouration is variable and the lighter coloured specimens are identical to I. cuneata. Hoare also points out that any differences in genitalia or antennae are not consistent enough to support a separate species.

== Description ==
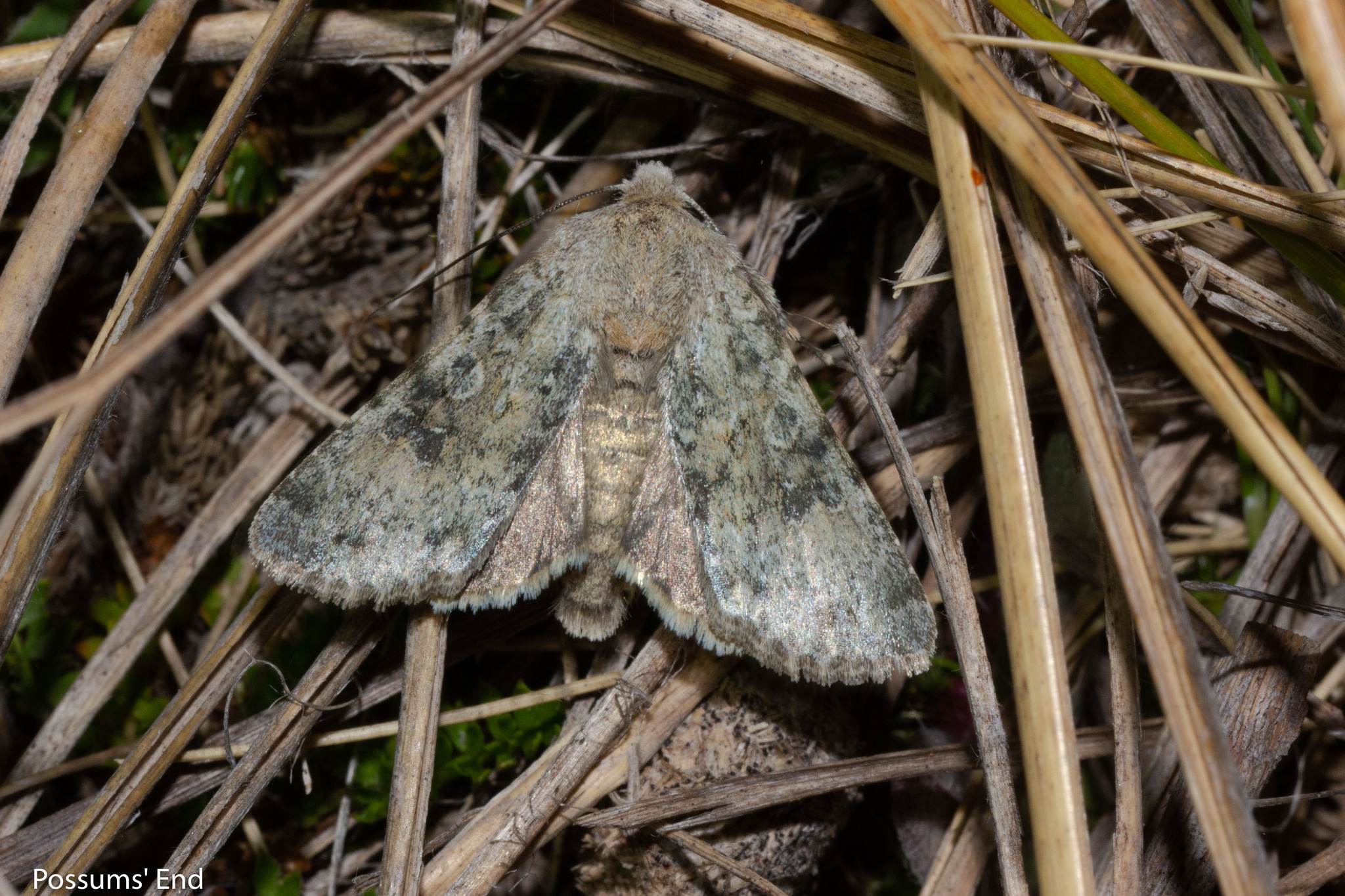
Ichneutica cuneata observed in Cromwell

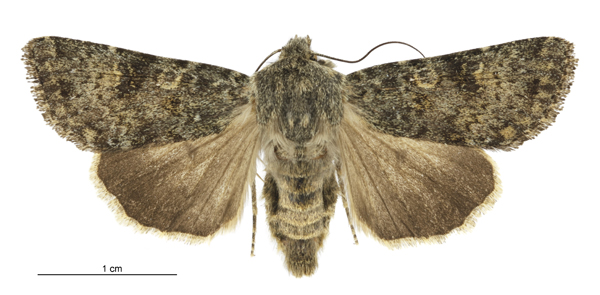
Female darker form collected at Tongariro National Park

Philpott reported that the species had a 38 to 39 mm wingspan. George Hudson described the species as follows:

The forewings are greyish-ochreous, strongly clouded with brownish-ochreous in the disc; all lines are very obscure, the orbicular is almost round, outlined in black towards the termen; the claviform very small with cloudy blackish edging; the reniform dull black; there is a cloudy median shade; all the leading veins are broadly marked in blueish-gray; a blackish patch is situated near the middle of the subterminal area, two at the cornus and another on vein 1 at the base of the wing. The hind-wings are greyish-ochreous with a very broad blackish terminal band.

The adult male of this species has a wingspan of between 32 and 39 mm where as the female has a wingspan of between 34 and 39 mm. I. cuneata can be distinguished from similar species by the black to dark grey kidney mark on the forewings of the species as well as the colour of the hindwing which gradually changes from ocherous-grey to a darker grey along the border. The underside of the hind wing also has a discal spot as well as a line. No similar species has these markings.

The population of this species found at Tongariro National Park and previously separated into a distinct species tends to be darker in appearance as a result of the blackish markings on the forewings. However these markings are variable.

== Distribution ==
This species is endemic to New Zealand. This species is only known from the Tongariro National Park in the North Island but is widespread in the South Island. I. cuneata was discovered by J. H. Lewis at Ophir. Along with Otago, I. cuneata has also been found in Canterbury in the South Island, as well as Mount Tongariro and Mount Ruapehu in the North Island.

== Habitat ==
This species frequents tussock grassland and shrubland in montane and subalpine areas. They have been recorded at altitudes of between 450 and 1640 m.

== Behaviour ==
The adult moths are on the wing from December to April and can be active during the day. However they are attracted to light and have been collected via a mercury vapour light trap. Adult moths have been known to rest on rocks.

== Life history and host plants ==
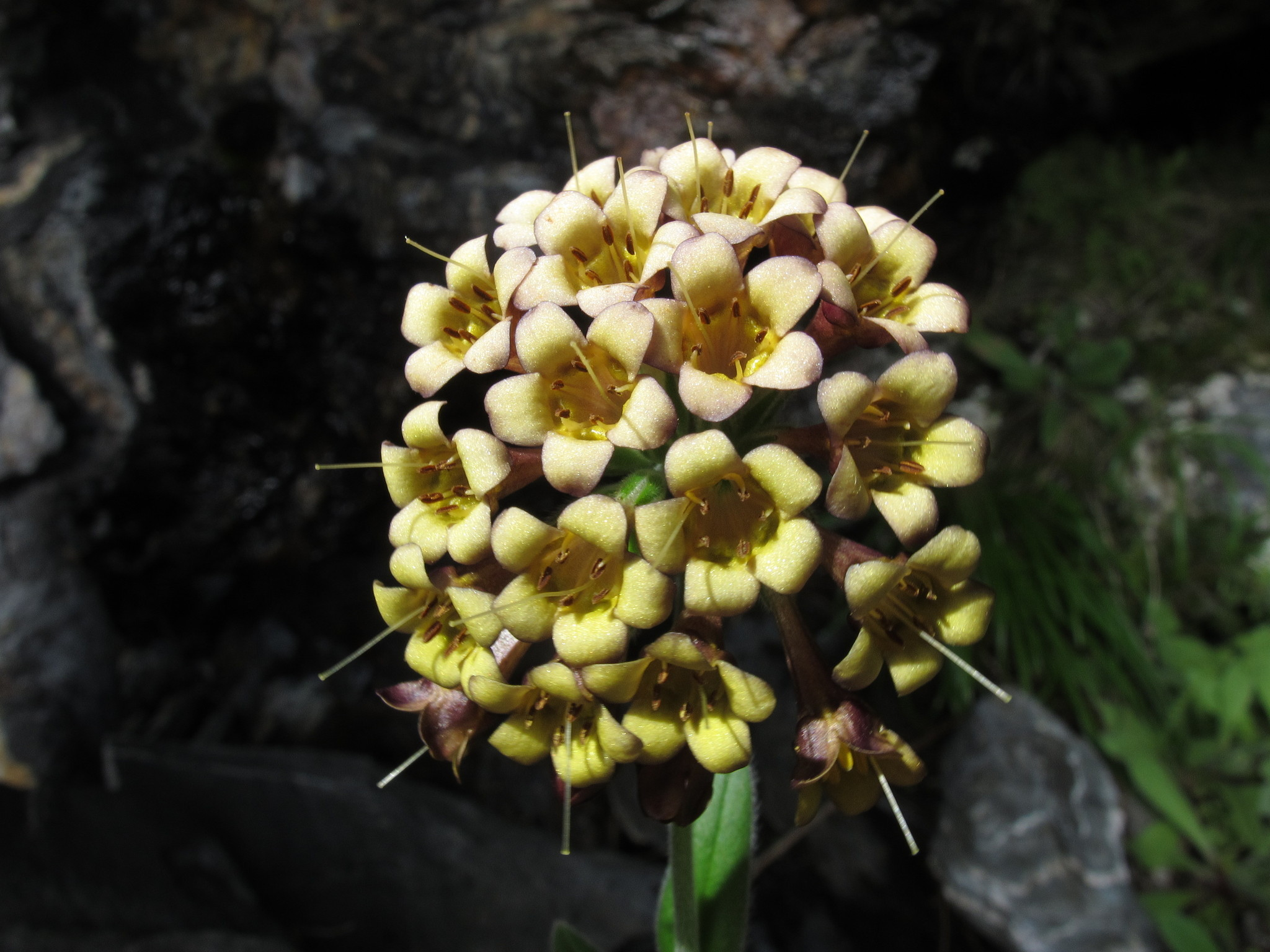
Myosotis macrantha, a plant known to host and be pollinated by adult I. cuneata moths

The life history of this species is unknown as are the specific host species of its larvae. However larvae of I. cuneata are said to feed on herbs. Adults have been shown to feed from and help pollinate Myosotis macrantha at Mount Cook.
