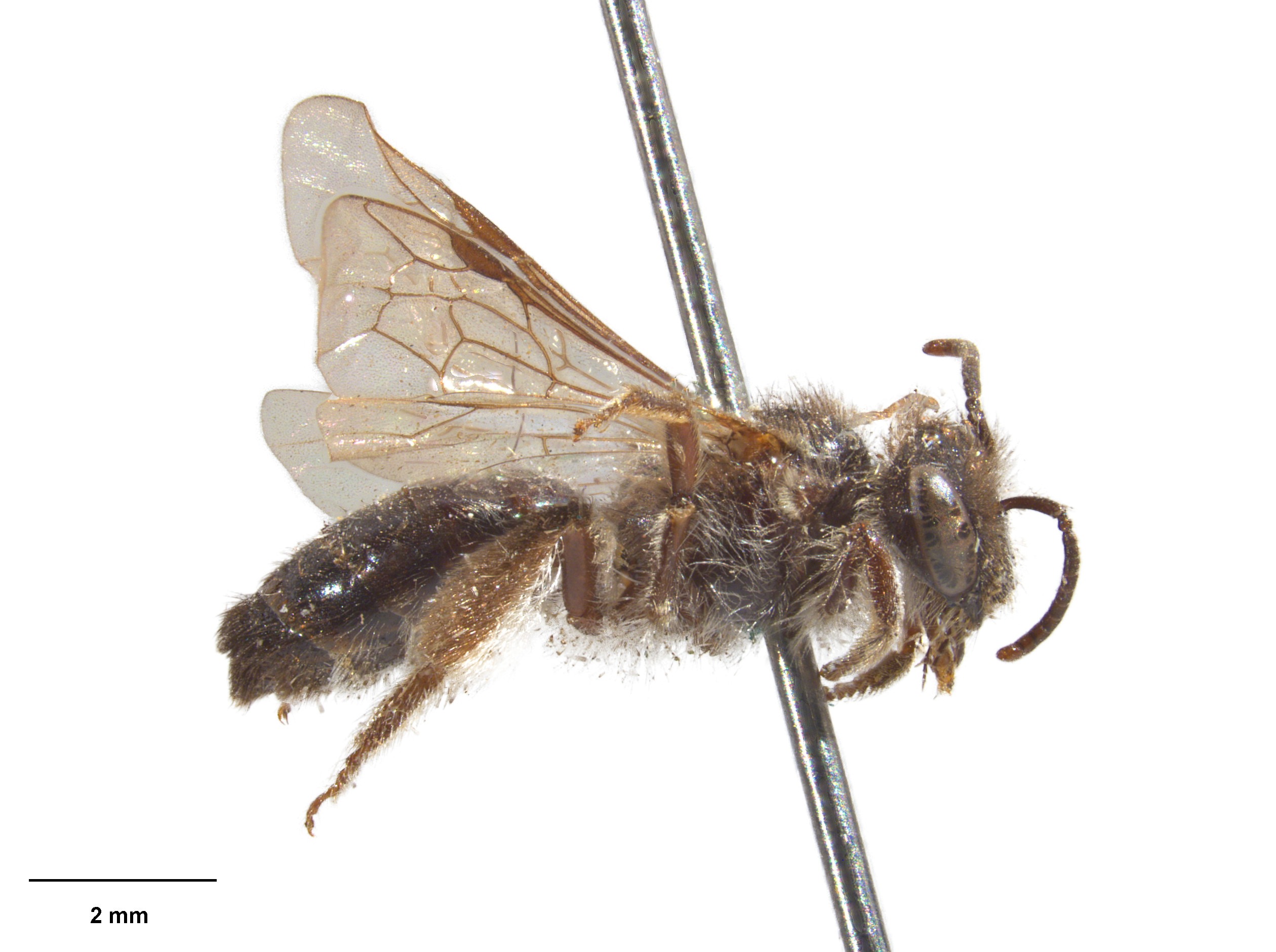

Scientific classification
- Kingdom: Animalia
- Phylum: Arthropoda
- Clade: Pancrustacea
- Class: Insecta
- Order: Hymenoptera
- Family: Colletidae
- Genus: Leioproctus
- Species: L. pango

Binomial name
- Leioproctus pango Donovan, 2007
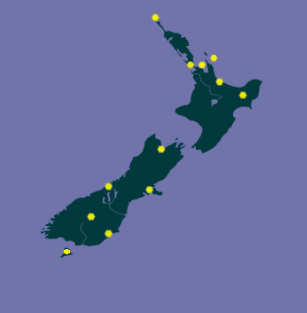
- Distribution map of Leioproctus pango sightings in New Zealand

= Leioproctus pango =

Species of bee

Leioproctus pango is a solitary bee species belonging to the genus Leioproctus, and family Colletidae. It is native to New Zealand.

== Description ==
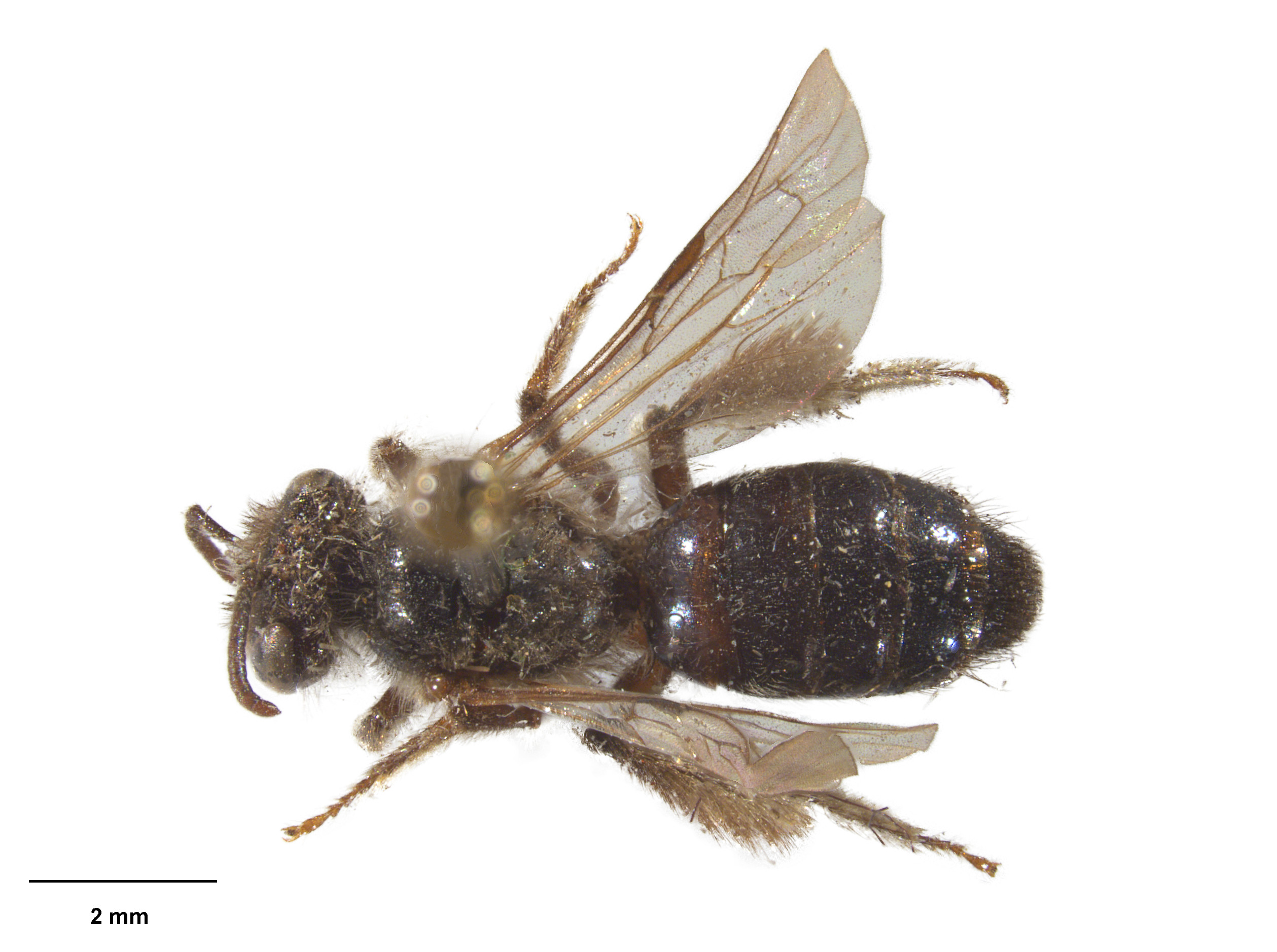
Female L. pango collected 2 January 1931 in Taupo.

Leioproctus pango is a small bee, measuring approximately 8-10 mm in length. Males are shorter in length than females. Its body is predominantly black with a slight metallic sheen. The thorax has sparse hair, while the ventral side is covered with denser hairs. The wings are translucent with a faint brownish tint, and the leg segments are mostly dark with pale joints. This species nests in soft soil and is commonly found in various regions of New Zealand.

== Taxonomy ==
This species was first described in 2007 by Barry James Donovan and named Leioproctus pango. In Maori, pango means black. Some specimens have a completely black coat or almost black coat, which is the only native bee with this characteristic.

== Habitat ==
Leioproctus pango is a ground-nesting bee plays a crucial role as a key pollinator for certain native plants, often exhibiting specific flower visitation patterns. It is typically active during the warmer months, when its flight season occurs. Its nesting and foraging behaviors are essential for the pollination of a variety of plant species, contributing to the health of local ecosystems.

Leioproctus pango typically nests in burrows it digs into the ground. As solitary bees, they excavate tunnels where they construct brood cells. Their nests mix pollen and nectar, shaping into a ball that sits in the base of the waterproof cell, which serve as food for the larva after the female lays an egg. Their nests are often located in sandy or loose soil environments.

== Pollination ==
Leioproctus pango carries pollen from Carmichaelia and the Myrtaceae. It is the most effective pollinator for Carmichaelia hollowayi. It shows a strong preference for Fabaceae. This preference has extended to introduced Lucerne (Medicago sativa) and white clover (Trifolium repens). It has also shown the ability to collect pollen from a wide range of different plant families, the most extreme example of which is the kiwi fruit. Despite the complete absence of nectar, both sexes eagerly forage for pollen.

== Distribution ==
Leioproctus pango is endemic in New Zealand. It is currently thought to be widely distributed throughout New Zealand and can be found on both the northern and southern islands as well as many coastal islands, including Stewart Island, and The Noises.
