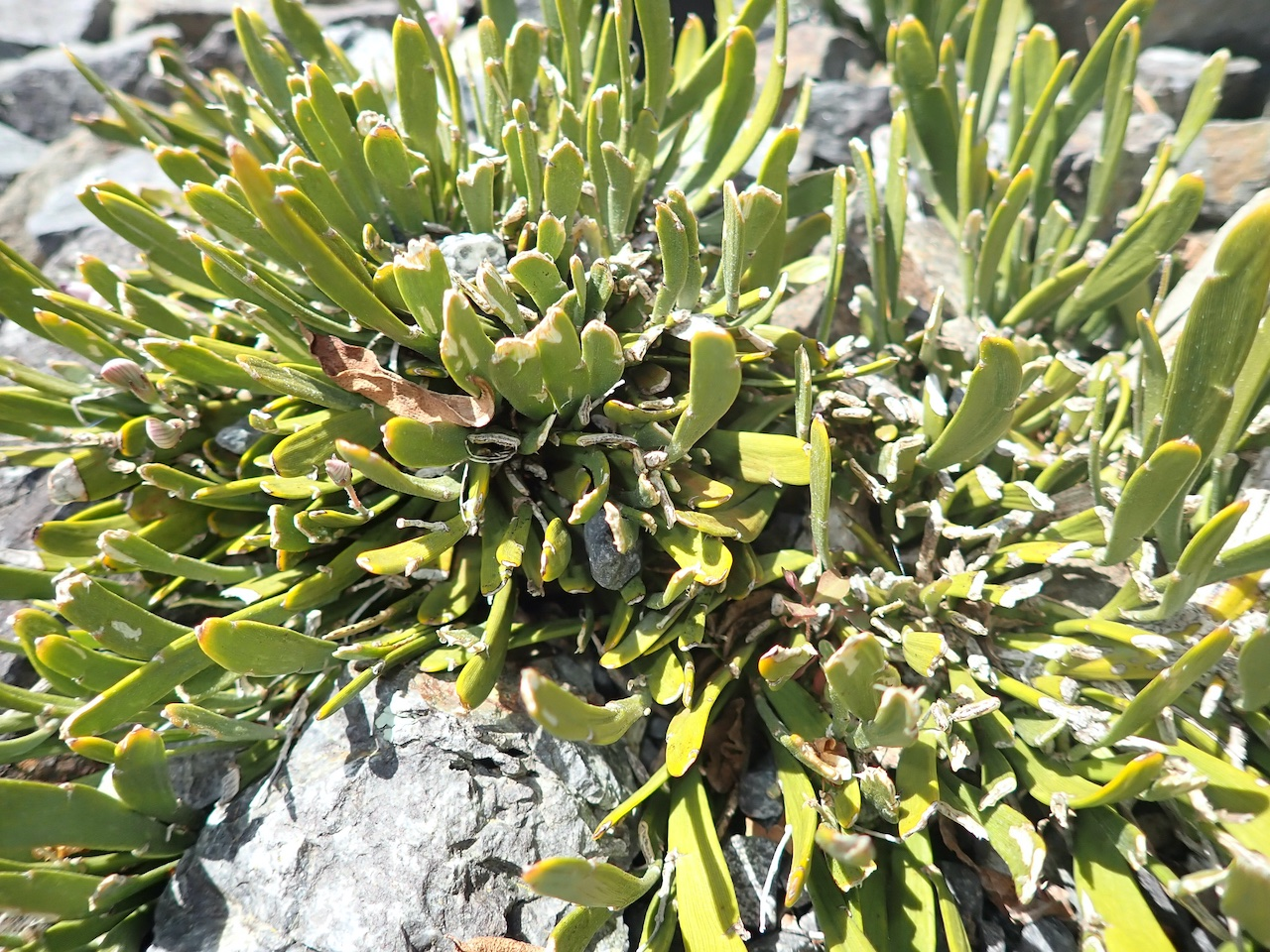

Conservation status
- Nationally Vulnerable (NZ TCS)

Scientific classification
- Kingdom: Plantae
- Clade: Tracheophytes
- Clade: Angiosperms
- Clade: Eudicots
- Clade: Rosids
- Order: Fabales
- Family: Fabaceae
- Subfamily: Faboideae
- Genus: Carmichaelia
- Species: C. astonii

Binomial name
- Carmichaelia astonii G.Simpson
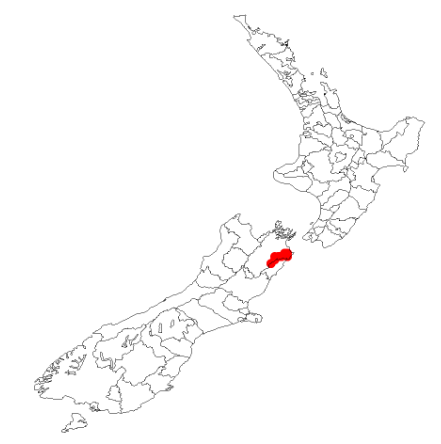
- Occurrence data from AVH

= Carmichaelia astonii =

Species of legume

Carmichaelia astonii (common name Aston's dwarf broom) is a species of pea in the family Fabaceae. It is found only in South Island of New Zealand. Its conservation status (2018) is "Nationally vulnerable" under the New Zealand Threat Classification System. The flowers appear pea-like, are pink, with a darker centre.

== Taxonomy and naming ==
The species was first described by George Simpson in 1945, who gave it the specific epithet, astonii, to honour Bernard Aston. A lectotype, AK 70629 collected by Simpson in February 1937 on the Ure River, in the Marlborough Region, is held in the Auckland Museum.
