= 1949 New Year Honours (New Zealand) =

Annual awards for New Zealanders

The 1949 New Year Honours in New Zealand were appointments by King George VI on the advice of the New Zealand government to various orders and honours to reward and highlight good works by New Zealanders, and to celebrate the passing of 1948 and the beginning of 1949. They were announced on 1 January 1949.

The recipients of honours are displayed here as they were styled before their new honour.

== Knight Bachelor ==
- The Honourable Robert Kennedy – senior puisne judge, Supreme Court of New Zealand.

== Order of Saint Michael and Saint George ==
=== Companion (CMG) ===
- William George Baird – New Zealand Public Trustee.
- Reverend James John Riordan – of Wellington. For services to the Māori people.

== Order of the British Empire ==
=== Knight Commander (KBE) ===
Civil division

- Arthur Telford Donnelly [[Bachelor of Laws|BL]] – Crown solicitor, Christchurch.
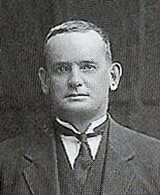
Sir Arthur Donnelly

=== Commander (CBE) ===
Civil division

- Bernard Cracroft Aston – of Wellington. For services to agriculture and botany.
- Emily Hancock McKinnon [[Bachelor of Medicine, Bachelor of Surgery|MB BCh]] – of Dunedin. For services in the field of medicine and welfare of women.
- Mary Elizabeth Richmond – of Wellington. For services in education and welfare work.
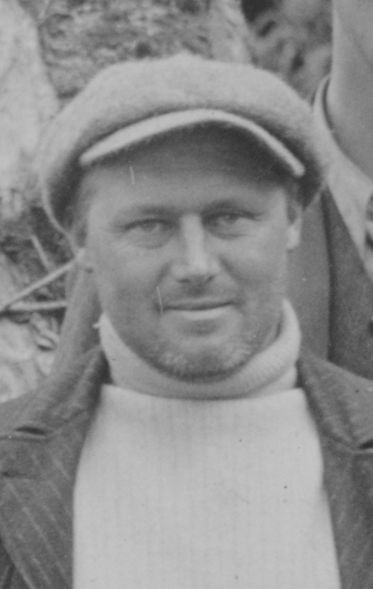
Bernard Aston

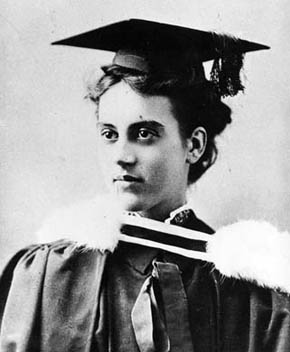
Emily McKinnon

=== Officer (OBE) ===
Civil division

- Claude Wilfred Batten – of Wellington. For services to returned servicemen of both wars.
- Eric Hattaway Bridgman MB BCh – superintendent of Rotorua Hospital.
- Alfred Puataata Grace – of Lake Taupo. For services to Māori people in connection with education and development of native lands.
- Joseph Linklater – of Manawatu. For services in connection with the supervision of disabled servicemen's farms.
- Wi Hapi Love – of Petone; chairman of Taranaki Māori Trust Board.
- William Ross McCulloch – secretary of the administration of Western Samoa.
- Victor Clement Peters – of Christchurch, founder and conductor of Christchurch Harmonic Society.
- Stanley Belton Pilcher – of San Francisco. For services in his capacity as honorary representative of the New Zealand government at San Francisco.
- Margaret Mary Pryde – of Dunedin. For services in connection with the Otago Early Settlers' Association.
- William Henry Rice JP – of Auckland; president of the Auckland District Council for Horticulture and vice-president of the Dunedin Executive Council.

Military division

- The Venerable Archdeacon Harold Mayo Harris RD – chaplain, Royal New Zealand Navy.
- Squadron Leader Hugh Gordon Wilson MM – Royal New Zealand Air Force.
- Wing Officer Frances Ida Kain – New Zealand Women's Auxiliary Air Force.
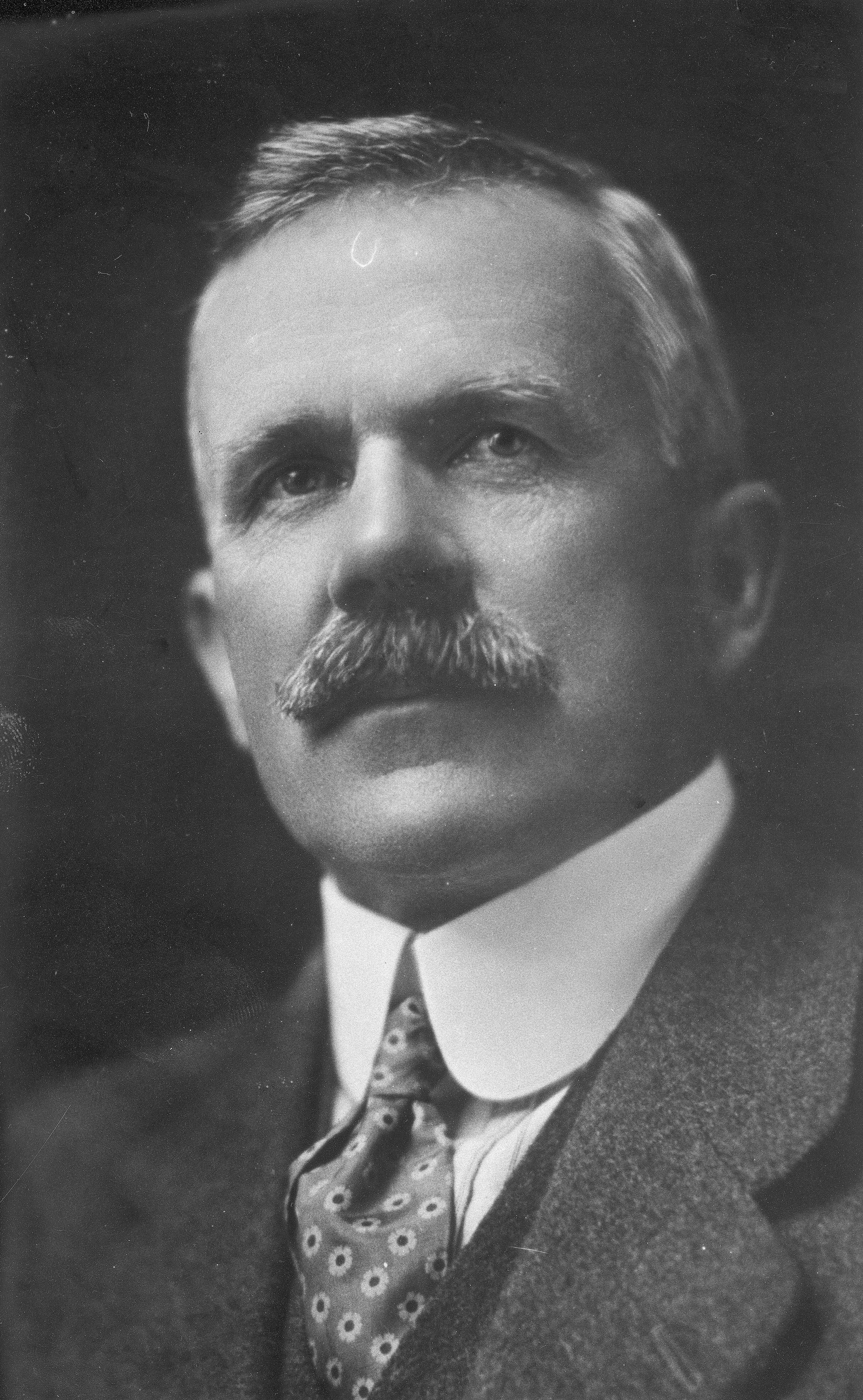
Joseph Linklater

=== Member (MBE) ===
Civil division

- Ann Buckley – of Christchurch. For services in connection with organisation and training of nurses.
- John Daniel Campbell JP – of Invercargill; chairman of Southland Centre of the Red Cross Society.
- Catherine Falconer Cameron – of Dunedin; president of Dunedin National Council of Women.
- Effie Julia Margaret Cardale JP – of Christchurch. For services in connection with the Society for the Protection of Women and Children.
- Frederick Carson – of Kaitangata. For services to the mining community in the Kaitangata district.
- Patrick Doyle – of Wellington; chief detective. For services with the Police Force.
- John Goodyer – of Motueka. For services to returned servicemen.
- John Henry Hall – of Gisborne. For services to local government.
- Mary Hamilton Harrison – of Wellington; secretary of the Lady Galway Guild. For patriotic and welfare activities.
- Edward Clarke Isaacs – of Dunedin. For long services in many fields of sport.
- Euphemia Ethel Law – of Wellington; formerly national president of the YWCA of New Zealand.
- Ada McMahon JP – of Hastings. For services in connection with the settlement of returned servicemen.
- William Brinsley Nicholson – of Lower Hutt. For long services in local government and education.
- John Barr Paterson JP – of Auckland; member of Auckland City Council, president of New Zealand Federation of Justices of the Peace.

Military division

- Instructor Lieutenant John Edward Holt – Royal Navy.
- Senior Commander Elsie Gray – New Zealand Women's Army Auxiliary Corps.
- Lieutenant and Quartermaster Richard John Healey – New Zealand Regular Force.
- Warrant Officer 1st Class Hugh Reginald Sigley – New Zealand Regiment.
- Flight Lieutenant Edgar William Geil Perry – Royal New Zealand Air Force.
- Flying Officer John William Prideaux Cook – Royal New Zealand Air Force.
- Warrant Officer Joseph Whittaker – Royal New Zealand Air Force.

== British Empire Medal (BEM) ==
Civil division

- Leonard Charles Enchmarch – tailor, naval base HMNZS Philomel.

Military division

- Chief Mechanician Joseph Kendal Croft – Royal New Zealand Navy.
- Master at Arms Charles Victor Harris – Royal New Zealand Navy.
- Chief Petty Officer William Harold Johnston – Royal New Zealand Navy.
- Sergeant Reginald Walter Coe – Royal New Zealand Artillery.
- Staff-Sergeant (temporary Warrant Officer 2nd Class) Florence Eugene Donovan – New Zealand Regiment.
- Sergeant Charles Edward Gleeson – Royal New Zealand Electrical and Mechanical Engineers.
- Sergeant Bernard Richard Crean – Royal New Zealand Air Force.
- Sergeant Phillip George Deibert – Royal New Zealand Air Force.
- Sergeant Annie Marshall Pettigrew – New Zealand Women's Auxiliary Air Force.

== Air Force Cross (AFC) ==
- Squadron Leader George Robert Brabyn – Royal New Zealand Air Force.
- Flight Lieutenant Robert Keith Walker – Royal New Zealand Air Force.

== King's Commendation for Valuable Service in the Air ==
- Colin James Fraser – Royal New Zealand Air Force.
- Robert Emry Weston – Royal New Zealand Air Force.
