= William Nicholson (journalist) =

William Brinsley Nicholson MBE JP (26 August 1877 – 25 November 1957) was a New Zealand clerk, local politician, builder, journalist and editor. He was born in Ōpōtiki, New Zealand, on 26 August 1877. He was elected to the Petone Borough Council aged 23. He was appointed a Member of the Order of the British Empire in the 1949 New Year Honours for long services in local government and education.
