= Kitty Kain =

New Zealand dietitian and air force leader (1908–1997)

Frances Ida "Kitty" Kain OBE (née Tyson, 17 September 1908 – 16 August 1997) was a New Zealand dietitian and women's air force leader. She was born in Dunedin, New Zealand on 17 September 1908. A teacher in British Malaya, she returned to New Zealand when the Second World War began. She was commander of the New Zealand Women's Auxiliary Air Force from 1941 until 1943. She was appointed an Officer of the Order of the British Empire in the 1949 New Year Honours.

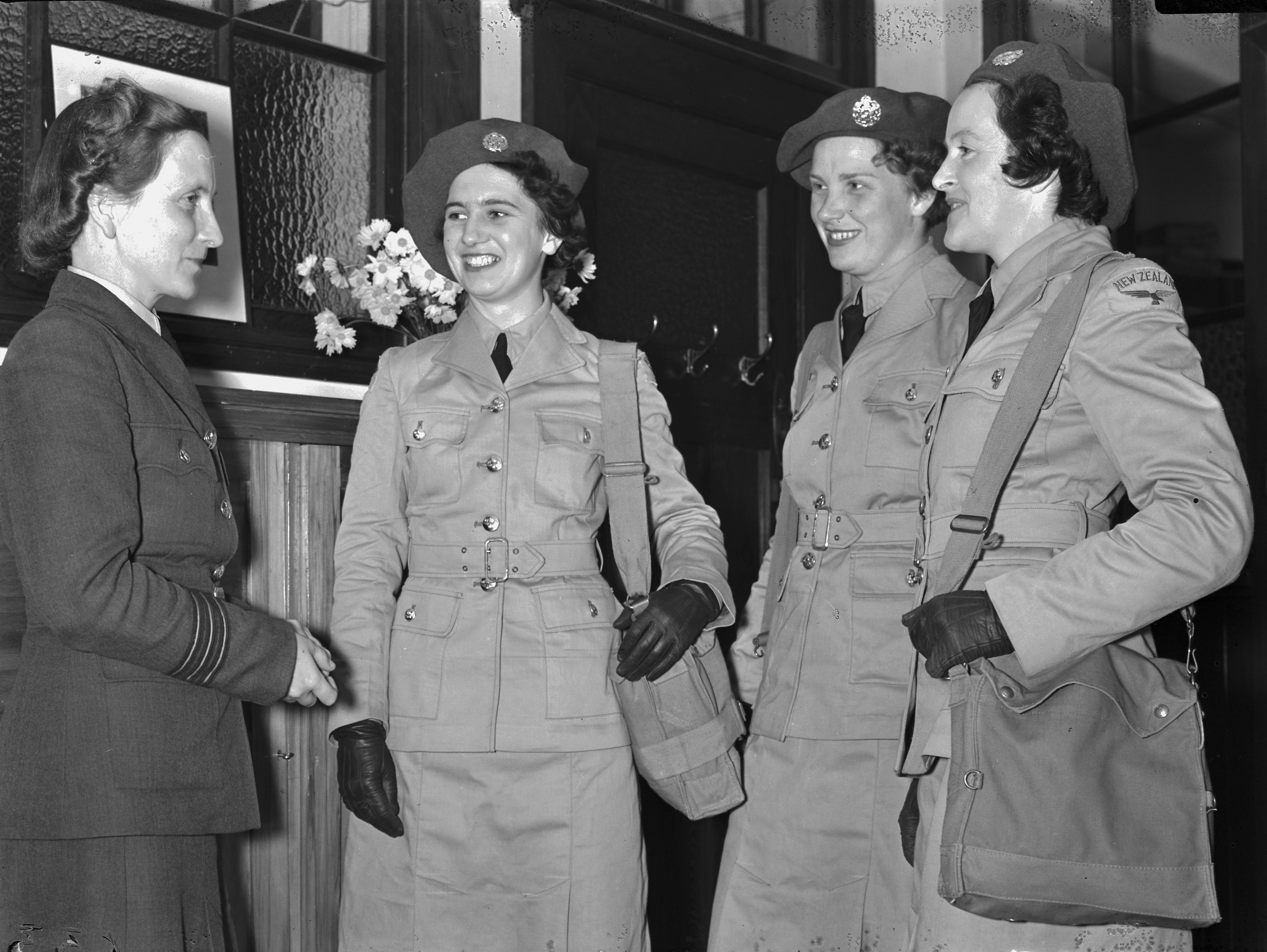
Kitty Kain, on the left, with WAAFs destined for service overseas, 1942
