= Effie Cardale =

New Zealand community and welfare worker

Effie Julia Margaret Cardale MBE (20 May 1873 – 19 October 1960) was a New Zealand community and welfare worker. She was born in Christchurch, New Zealand, on 20 May 1873. She was appointed a Member of the Order of the British Empire in the 1949 New Year Honours for services in connection with the Society for the Protection of Women and Children.
