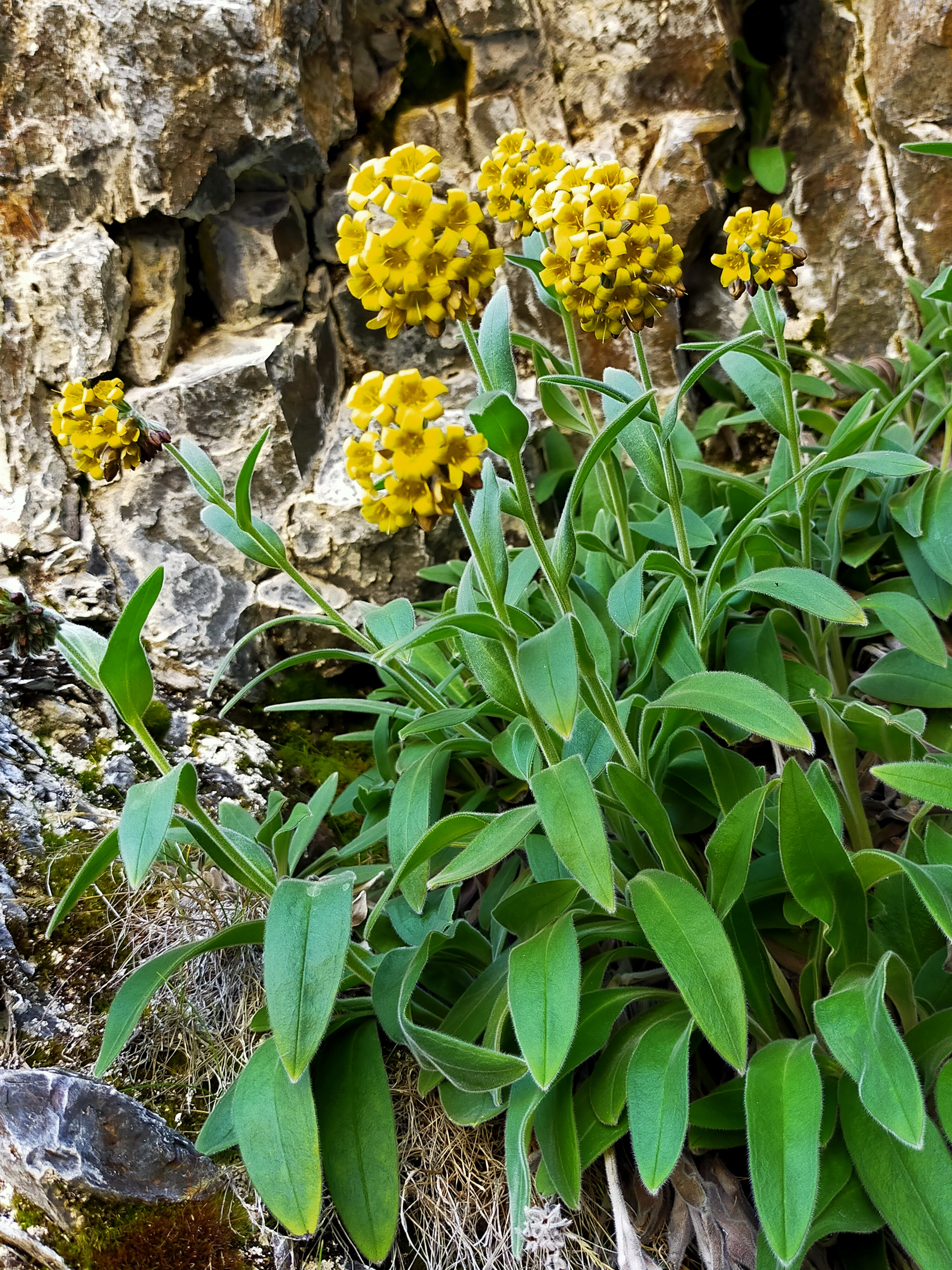
- flowering plants of Myosotis macrantha

Conservation status
- Not Threatened (NZ TCS)

Scientific classification
- Kingdom: Plantae
- Clade: Tracheophytes
- Clade: Angiosperms
- Clade: Eudicots
- Clade: Asterids
- Order: Boraginales
- Family: Boraginaceae
- Genus: Myosotis
- Species: M. macrantha

Binomial name
- Myosotis macrantha (Hook.f.)Cheeseman

= Myosotis macrantha =

Species of flowering plant

Myosotis macrantha or the Bronze Forget-Me-Not is a species of flowering plant in the family Boraginaceae, endemic to the South Island of New Zealand. Joseph Dalton Hooker described the species as Exarrhena macrantha in 1864, and Thomas Cheeseman transferred it to the genus Myosotis in 1885. Plants of this species of forget-me-not are perennial rosettes with ebracteate inflorescences and yellow to dark purple corollas with stamens that are exserted.

== Taxonomy and etymology ==
Myosotis macrantha (Hook.f.) Cheeseman is in the plant family Boraginaceae. The species was originally described as Exarrhena macrantha Hook.f. in 1867 by Joseph Dalton Hooker in Handbook of the New Zealand Flora. Thomas Cheeseman transferred it to Myosotis saxosa (Hook.f.) Cheeseman in 1885. Myosotis macrantha is not mentioned in Genera Plantarum by Bentham and Hooker, and therefore ‘M. macrantha (Hook.f.) Benth. & Hook.f,’ is not the correct author citation.

The most recent treatment of this species was done by Lucy B. Moore in the Flora of New Zealand.

The original specimens (syntypes) of Myosotis macrantha were collected by several different collectors at multiple sites in the South Island, New Zealand, and are likely lodged at Kew Herbarium (e.g. K000787875).

Three varieties have been described within M. macrantha:

- M. macrantha var. pulchra Cheeseman
- M. macrantha var. westlandica Petrie
- M. macrantha var. diversa G.Simpson & J.S.Thomson
- M. macrantha var. macrantha (autonym)

Since their descriptions, these varieties have not been used or referred to often in the literature, and Lucy Moore suggested that none of these varieties "is sufficiently distinct to be maintained without further evidence".

Vegetatively, Myosotis macrantha is similar to M. explanata, whereas the flowers are similar to those of M. arnoldii.

== Phylogeny ==
Myosotis macrantha was shown to be a part of the monophyletic southern hemisphere lineage of Myosotis in phylogenetic analyses of standard DNA sequencing markers (nuclear ribosomal DNA and chloroplast DNA regions) of New Zealand Myosotis. Within the southern hemisphere lineage, species relationships were not well resolved. Of the five individuals of M. macrantha included in the study, up to three individuals clustered together and sometimes with individuals of M. angustata or M. explanata, depending on the analysis.

== Description ==
Myosotis macrantha plants are rosettes. The rosette leaves have broad petioles that are about as long as the leaf blades. The rosette leaves are 30–120 mm long by 6–20 mm wide (length: width ratio c. 5–6: 1), and the leaf blade is obovate to lanceolate-spathulate, widest below, at or above the middle, with a subacute apex. Both surfaces of the leaf are uniformly and sparsely to densely covered in patent to erect hairs. The upper surface of the leaf has densely distributed appressed to erect antrorse (forward-facing) whereas on the lower surface the hairs are mostly appressed and retrorse (backward-facing) except for some antrorse hairs near the tip. Each rosette has several ascending to erect, ebracteate inflorescences that are up to 300 mm long. The cauline leaves are similar to the rosette leaves, but are smaller and become smaller toward the top of the inflorescence, lanceolate, and subacute, and have hairs similar to the rosette leaves except the upper cauline leaves may not have retrorse hairs on the lower surfaces. The flowers are many per inflorescence, and each is borne on a short pedicel, without a bract. The calyx is 6–9 mm long at flowering and fruiting, lobed to one-half tor more of its length, and densely covered in patent to erect, antrorse hairs that are mostly antrorse, but some are retrorse near the base and others are hooked. The corolla is yellow, brownish or purple and can reach 15 mm in diameter, with a cylindrical tube, and small scales alternating with the petals (the scales are sometimes absent or obscure). The anthers are exserted, surpassing the faucal scales. The nutlets are c. 3 mm long by 1.5 mm wide.

The pollen of Myosotis macrantha is unknown.

The chromosome number of M. macrantha is unknown.

Flowering December–March and fruiting February–May.

== Distribution and habitat ==
Myosotis macrantha is a forget-me-not that occurs in high-elevation habitats in the South Island of New Zealand, particularly along the western side, in Western Nelson, Canterbury, Westland, Otago and Fiordland.

Myosotis macranthais likely to be an outcrossing species, with plants requiring a pollinating vector to achieve pollination and seed set.

== Conservation status ==
Myosotis macrantha is listed as Not Threatened on the most recent assessment (2017–2018) under the New Zealand Threatened Classification system for plants.

== Gallery ==
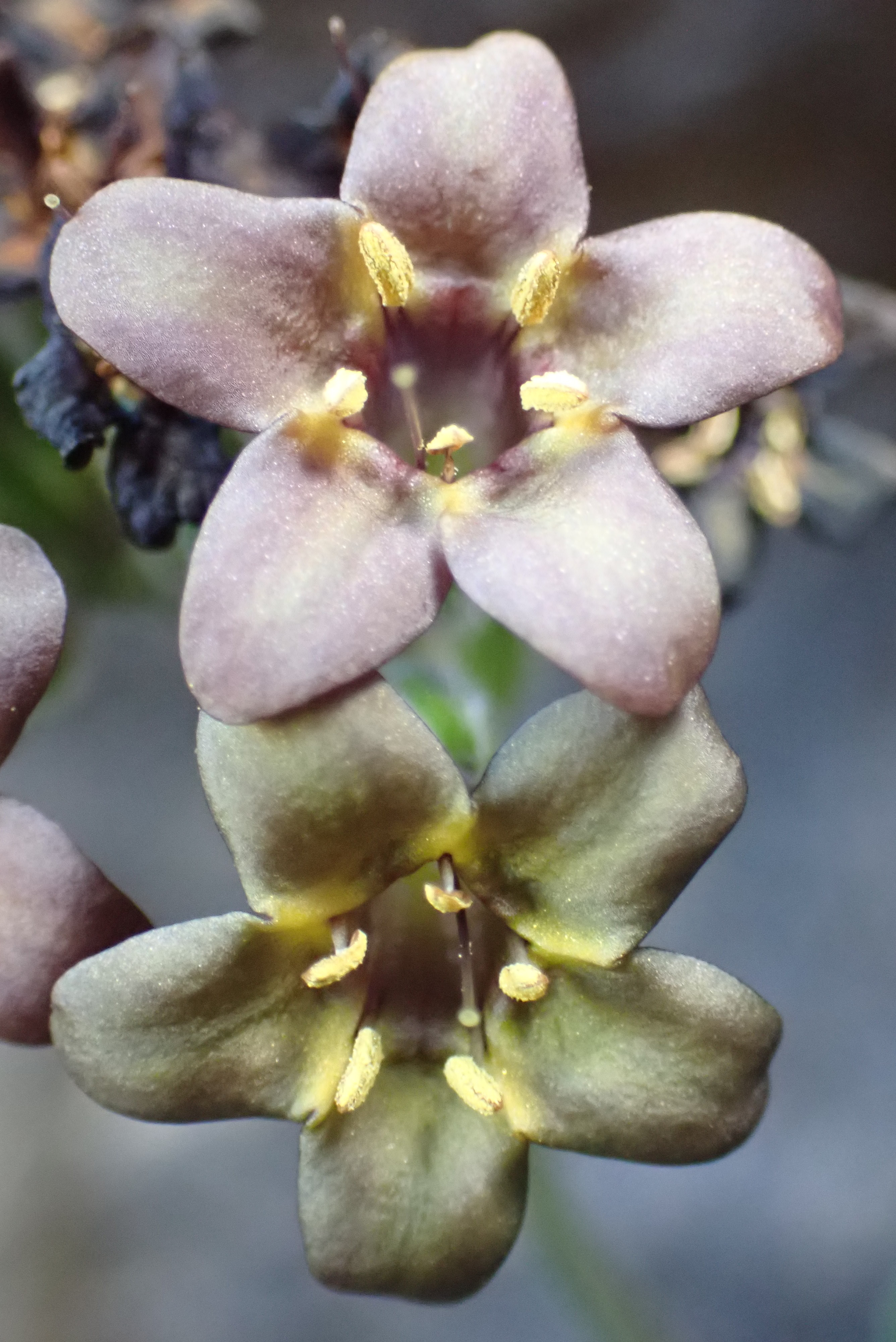
Close-up of light coloured flowers

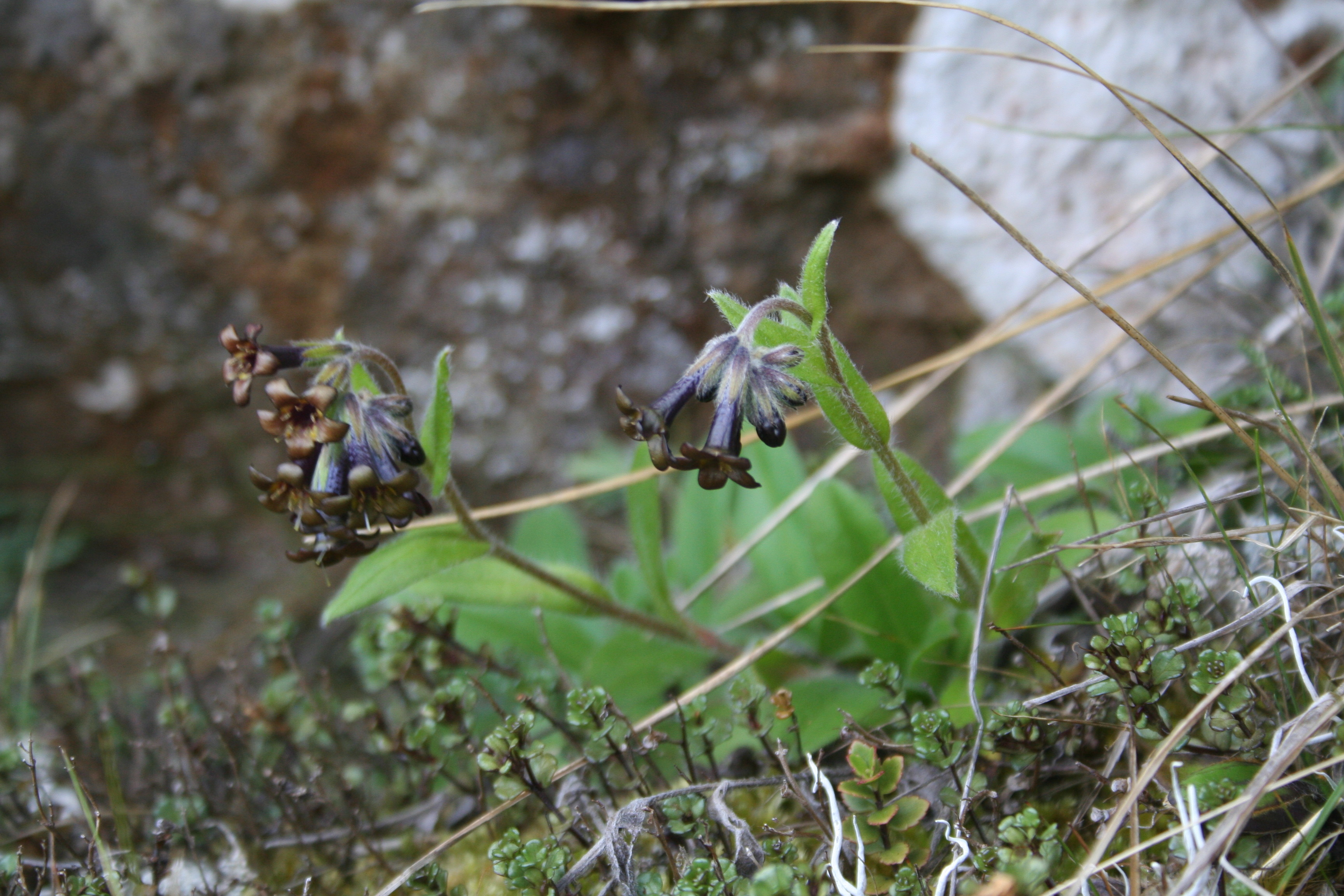
Plant with dark maroon flowers

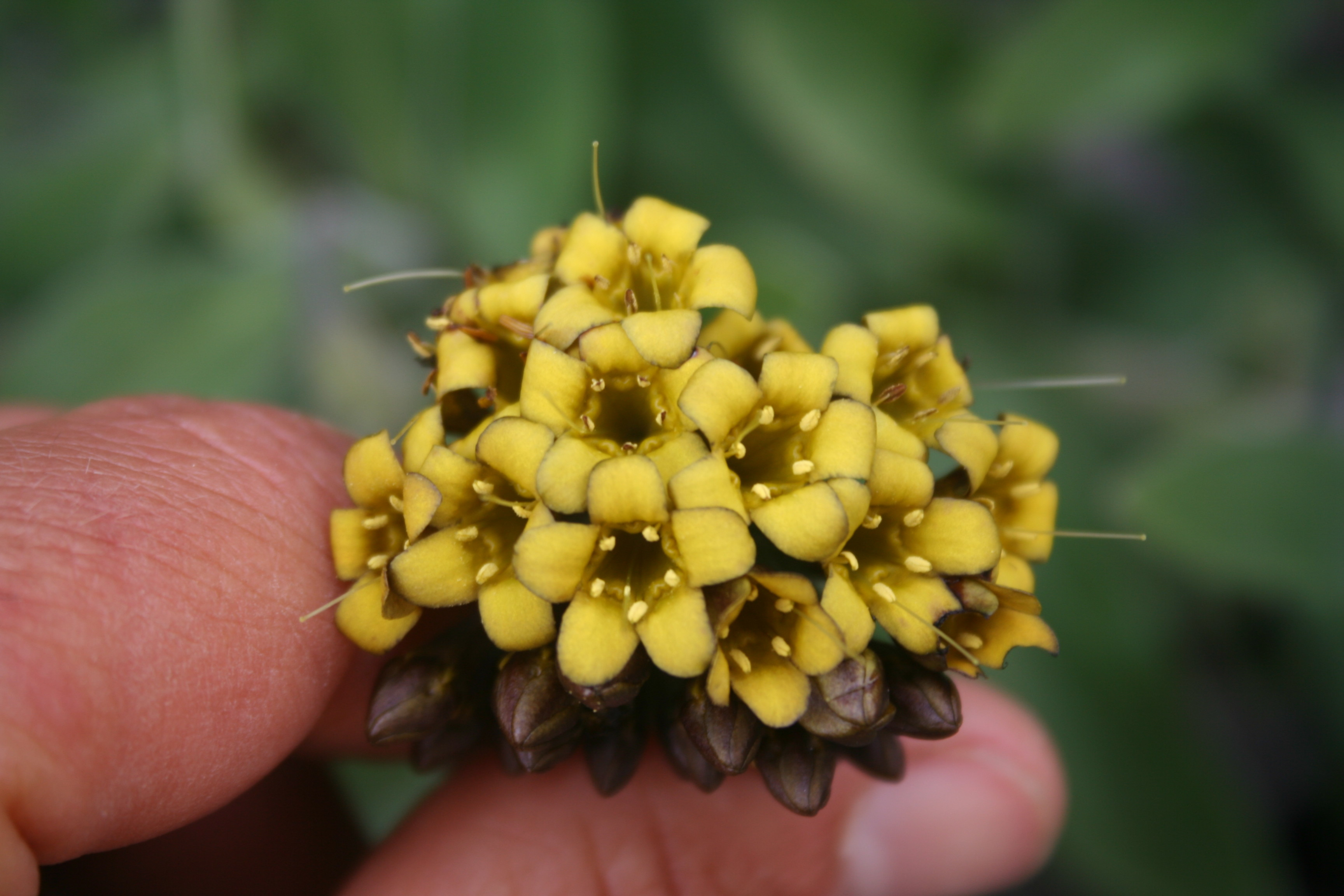
Close-up of flowers with yellow corolla lobes

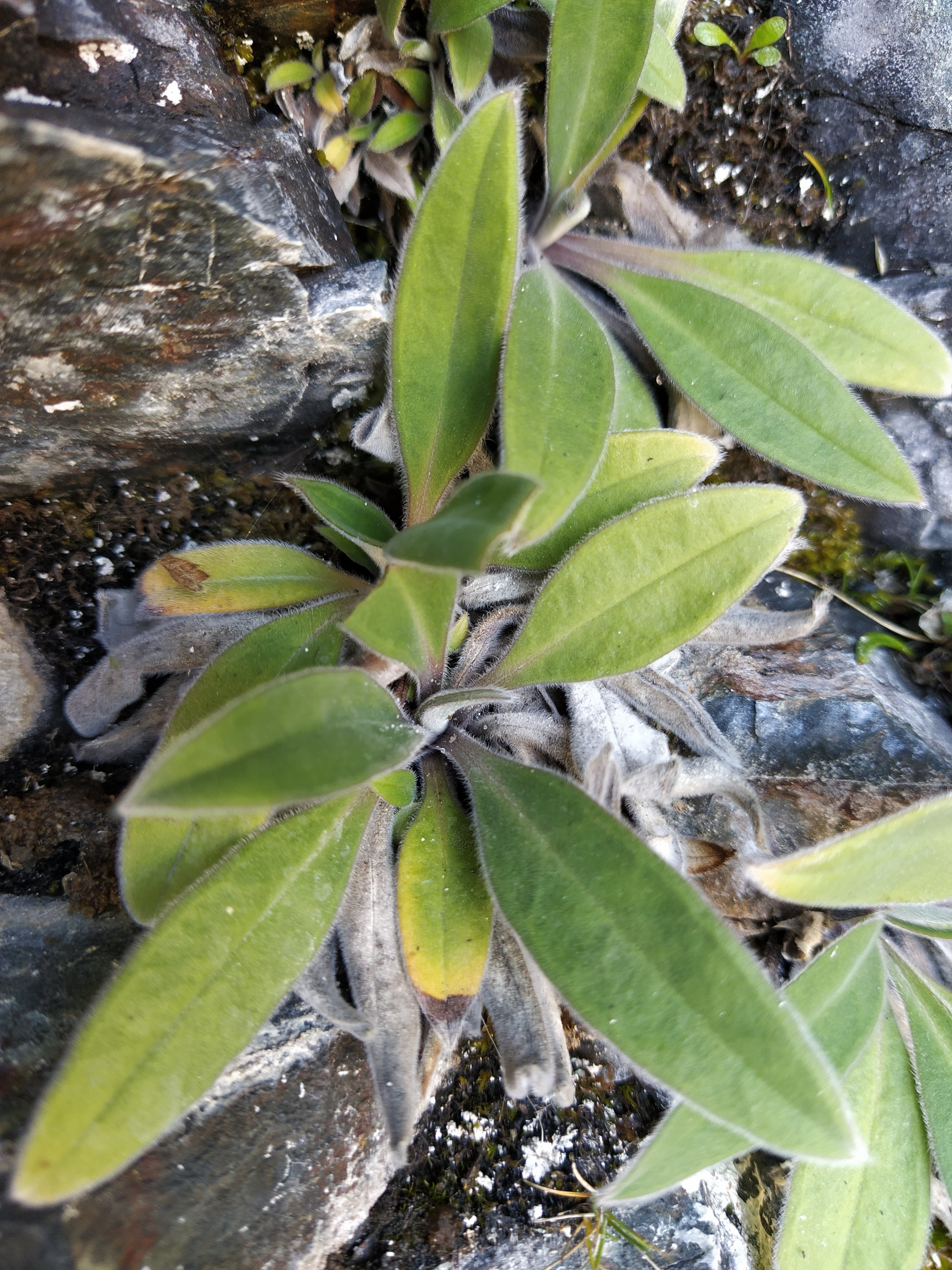
Rosette leaves
