= George Simpson (botanist) =

New Zealand naturalist and botanist (1880–1952)

George Simpson FLS FRSNZ
- Born: 14 October 1880; Dunedin
- Died: 16 May 1952 (aged 71); Dunedin
- Scientific career
- Fields: Botany
- Author abbrev. (botany): G.Simpson

George Simpson (1880–1952) was a New Zealand naturalist and botanist. He was born in Dunedin, the son of a master builder. He, too, became a builder and valuer, working as Crown Valuer from about 1943 until early 1950. However, he, together with John Scott Simpson, became interested in collecting and growing New Zealand native plants and by 1925 both were well known within the New Zealand botanical community.

In 1930, he was elected a fellow of the Linnean Society, In 1945, he published his monograph on Carmichaelia. In 1949 he was elected a fellow of the Royal Society of New Zealand, FRSNZ.

The standard author abbreviation G.Simpson is used to indicate this person as the author when citing a botanical name.

== Names published ==
(List incomplete: 74 names published)

- Myosotis ramificata G.Simpson, Trans. & Proc. Roy. Soc. N. Z. lxxix. 426 (1952).
- Myosotis tenuis G.Simpson & J.S.Thomson, Trans. & Proc. Roy. Soc. N. Z. lxxiii. 161 (1943).
- Wahlenbergia laxa G.Simpson, Trans. & Proc. Roy. Soc. N. Z. lxxix. 430 (1952).
- Wahlenbergia ramosa G.Simpson, Trans. & Proc. Roy. Soc. N. Z. lxxv. 196 (1945).
- Brachyscome brevifolia G.Simpson, Trans. & Proc. Roy. Soc. N. Z. lxxix. 432 (1952).
- Celmisia spedeni G.Simpson, Trans. & Proc. Roy. Soc. N. Z. lxxv. 200 (1945).
- Carmichaelia solandri G.Simpson, Trans. & Proc. Roy. Soc. N. Z. lxxv. 253 (1945). (synonym of Carmichaelia australis R.Br.)
- Carmichaelia appressa G.Simpson, Trans. & Proc. Roy. Soc. N. Z. lxxv. 263 (1945).
- Carmichaelia astonii G.Simpson, Trans. & Proc. Roy. Soc. N. Z. lxxv. 253 (1945).
- Carmichaelia hollowayi G.Simpson, Trans. & Proc. Roy. Soc. N. Z. lxxv. 277 (1945).

(These may not be accepted names.)

== Eponymy ==
(From Godley, 1997)

- Ranunculus simpsonii
- Ourissia sessifolia var. simpsonii
- Wahlenburgia simpsonii J.A.Hay (synonym of Wahlenbergia albomarginata subsp. flexilis (Petrie) J.A.Petterson
