= Bernard Aston =

New Zealand agricultural chemist, botanist and photographer (1871–1951)

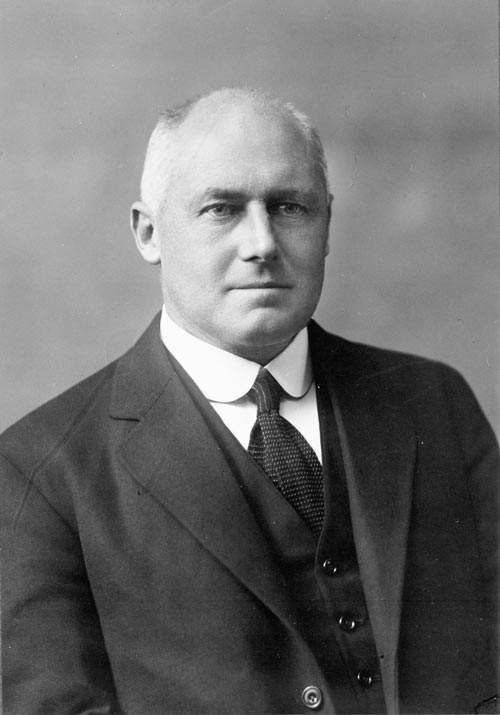
Aston (year unknown)

Bernard Cracroft Aston CBE (9 August 1871 – 31 May 1951), also known as Barney Aston, was New Zealand's first official agricultural chemist and was also a notable botanist. He was born in Beckenham, Kent, England, on 9 August 1871. He was a member of the 1907 Sub-Antarctic Islands Scientific Expedition. He was appointed a Commander of the Order of the British Empire in the 1949 New Year Honours for services to agriculture and botany.
