= New Zealand Women's Auxiliary Air Force =

Women's Auxiliary Air Force
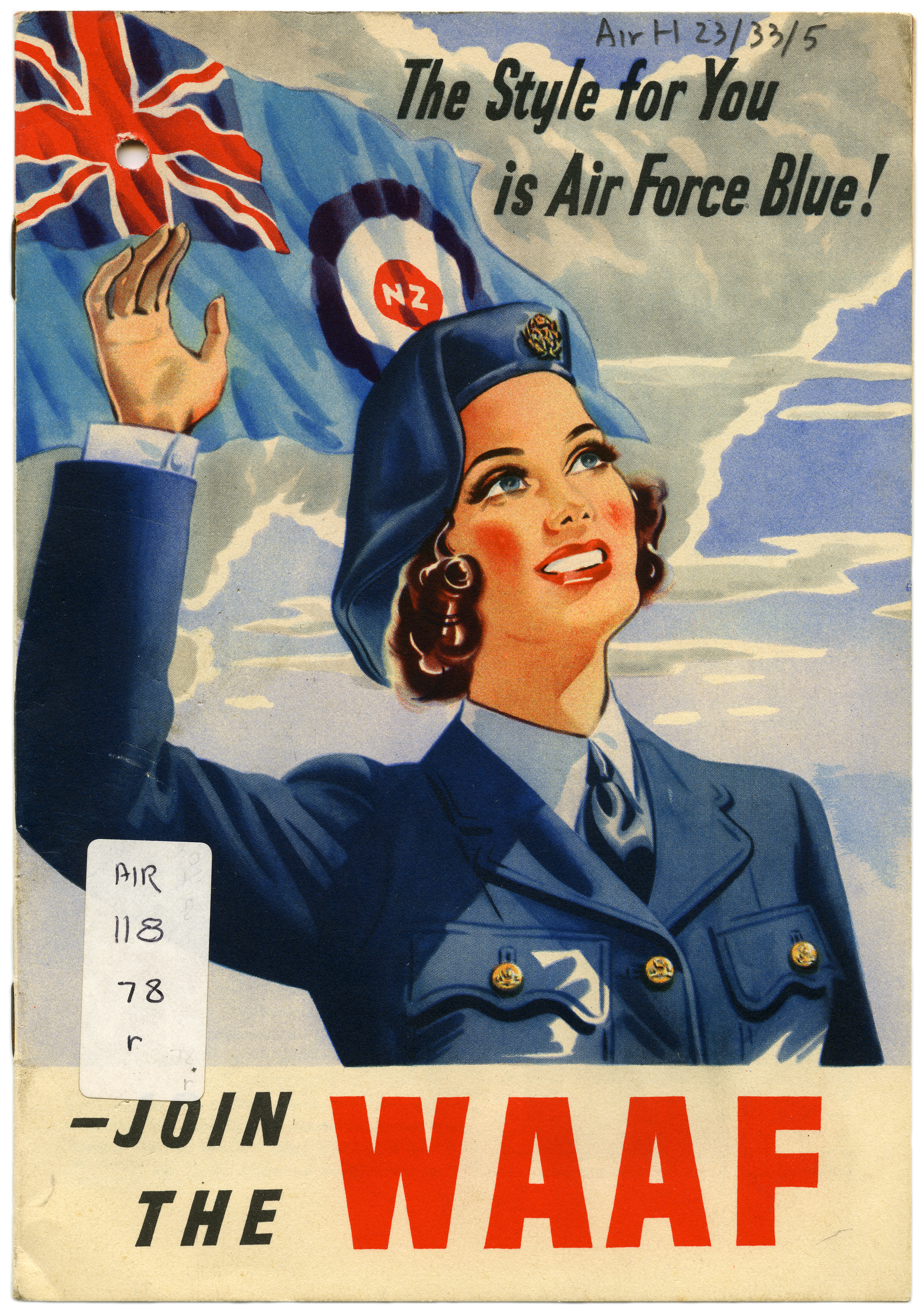
- Cover of recruitment booklet.
- Active: 1941–1954
- Country: New Zealand
- Branch: Royal New Zealand Air Force
- Type: Women's service
- Size: 3,800 (at peak strength)
- Engagements: World War II

Commanders
- Notable commanders: Frances Ida Kain (1941–1943)

The Women's Auxiliary Air Force was the female auxiliary of the Royal New Zealand Air Force during the Second World War. Established in 1941, it began with an initial draft of 200 women, reaching a peak strength of about 3,800, with a total of about 4,750 women passing through its ranks, of who more than 100 achieved commissioned officer rank.

== Service history ==
The New Zealand War Cabinet approved the formation of the Women's Auxiliary Air Force on 16 January 1941, in order to release more men for military service overseas. It was envisaged that WAAF members "could be used in some clerical trades and jobs of a domestic nature, peculiar to the feminine temperament and unpopular with men." On 18 March 1941 Frances Ida "Kitty" Kain (1908–1997) was appointed Superintendent. She was then the dietitian in charge at Hobart General Hospital, and was apparently recommended for the post by Muriel Bell, the Director of Nutrition Research at the University of Otago Medical School. Since the WAAF was initially founded "to take over messing, to control every phase of the choice, preparation, and serving of food", Kain was considered an appropriate choice, given her training and management skills.

The initial draft of 200 women were posted to the RNZAF air base at Rongotai, Wellington, in April 1941. Initially WAAFs were not provided with accommodation and had to either live at home or find lodgings for themselves, but eventually quarters were provided on the air stations where they served. By January 1942 WAAFs were based at 11 air stations, serving as cooks, mess-hands, drivers, clerks, equipment assistants, medical orderlies and shorthand typists. The general ratio of replacement was five women to four men.

WAAF Rank Structure
WAAF Rank	RNZAF Rank
Wing Officer	Wing Commander
Squadron Officer	Squadron Leader
Flight Officer	Flying Officer
Assistant Section Officer	Pilot Officer
Under Officer	Warrant Officer
Senior Sergeant	Flight Sergeant
Sergeant	Sergeant
Corporal	Corporal
Leading Aircraftswoman	Leading Aircraftsman
Women's Auxiliary 1st Class (WA1)	Aircraftsman, 2nd Class (AC2)

By June 1942 its strength had risen to 2,100.

The value of the WAAF was eventually recognised in October 1942 when, under the terms of the Women's Auxiliary Air Force Emergency Regulations Act, it was incorporated into the RNZAF, with WAAFs receiving service ranks equivalent to those of men for the first time. Superintendent Kain became Wing Officer Kain, with rank equivalent to wing commander.

By the end of 1942 WAAFs were serving on 21 air stations, and were eventually posted to every major station in New Zealand, and some served overseas. In January 1943 a party of 19 WAAFs were sent to Fiji to serve as shorthand typists, clerks, drivers, and equipment assistants. Later, as the size of the party expanded to 77, wireless operators, telephone and teleprinter operators, and cipher officers predominated, and it also included meteorological observers and medical orderlies. Only volunteers aged between 23 and 33 were permitted to go, with a tour of duty limited to eighteen months. This was later reduced to nine months, to allow more WAAFs to serve overseas. A WAAF detachment also served on Norfolk Island, which at its largest numbered 94, mostly cipher officers, but also including medical orderlies, and a clerk-librarian.

In July 1943 the number of women in the service had increased to over 3,600.

In December 1943, Kain, pregnant with her second child, left the WAAF, handing over command to her assistant Elsie Naomi Carlyon.

== Recruitment and training ==
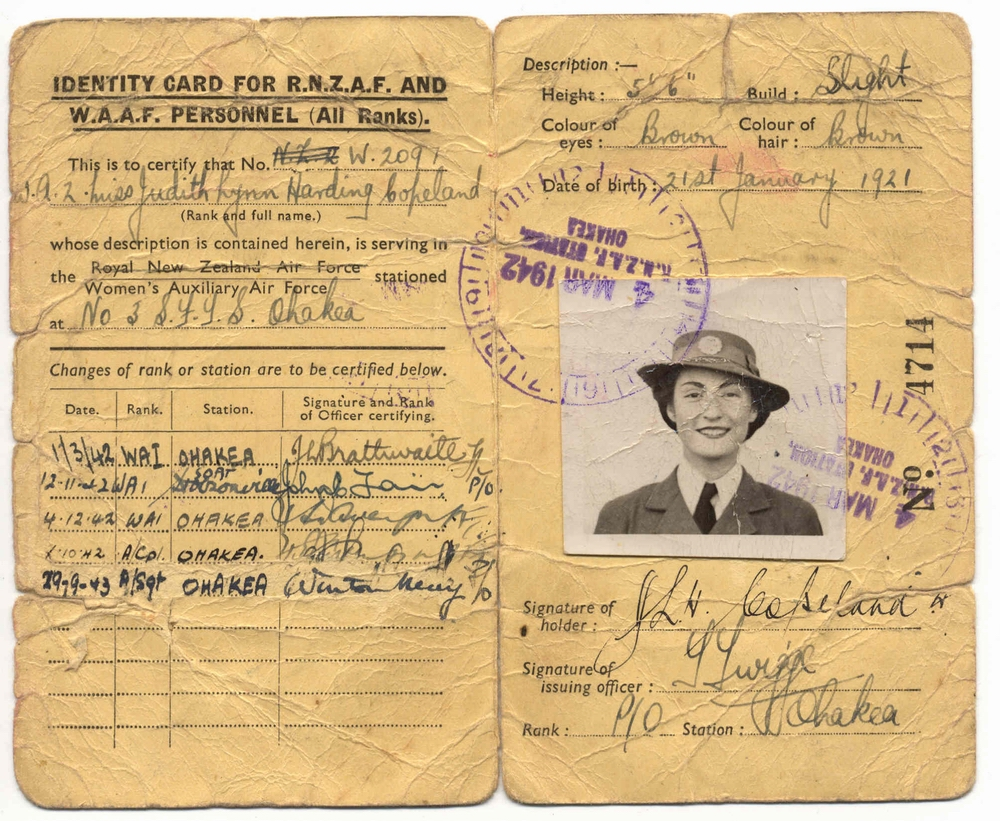
Identity card of WAAF Judith Copeland, 1943.

The WAAF selected its recruits by touring selection boards which interviewed applicants. The minimum age for enlistment was 18, but the average age of a WAAF in 1941 was 27. Between 1941 and 1945 some 7,886 women applied to join, of whom 4,753 were accepted.

In late 1942 four hundred women were specially recruited for duty in radar and meteorological units. Usually recruits were given no guarantee of duty of a specific type, though the personal qualities, education, and training of the recruit were taken into account when allocating postings. Recruits with no particular skills were usually first assigned to mess duties, before being considered for other work.

WAAF entrants were initially trained at the stations where they joined, but in July 1943 a central recruit reception depot was set up in Levin, designed to take 100 new entrants a month. Each WAAF completed a three-week course, learning drill and discipline, receiving lectures on regulations, service etiquette, and "such knowledge of Air Force Law as was necessary for an airwoman to know."

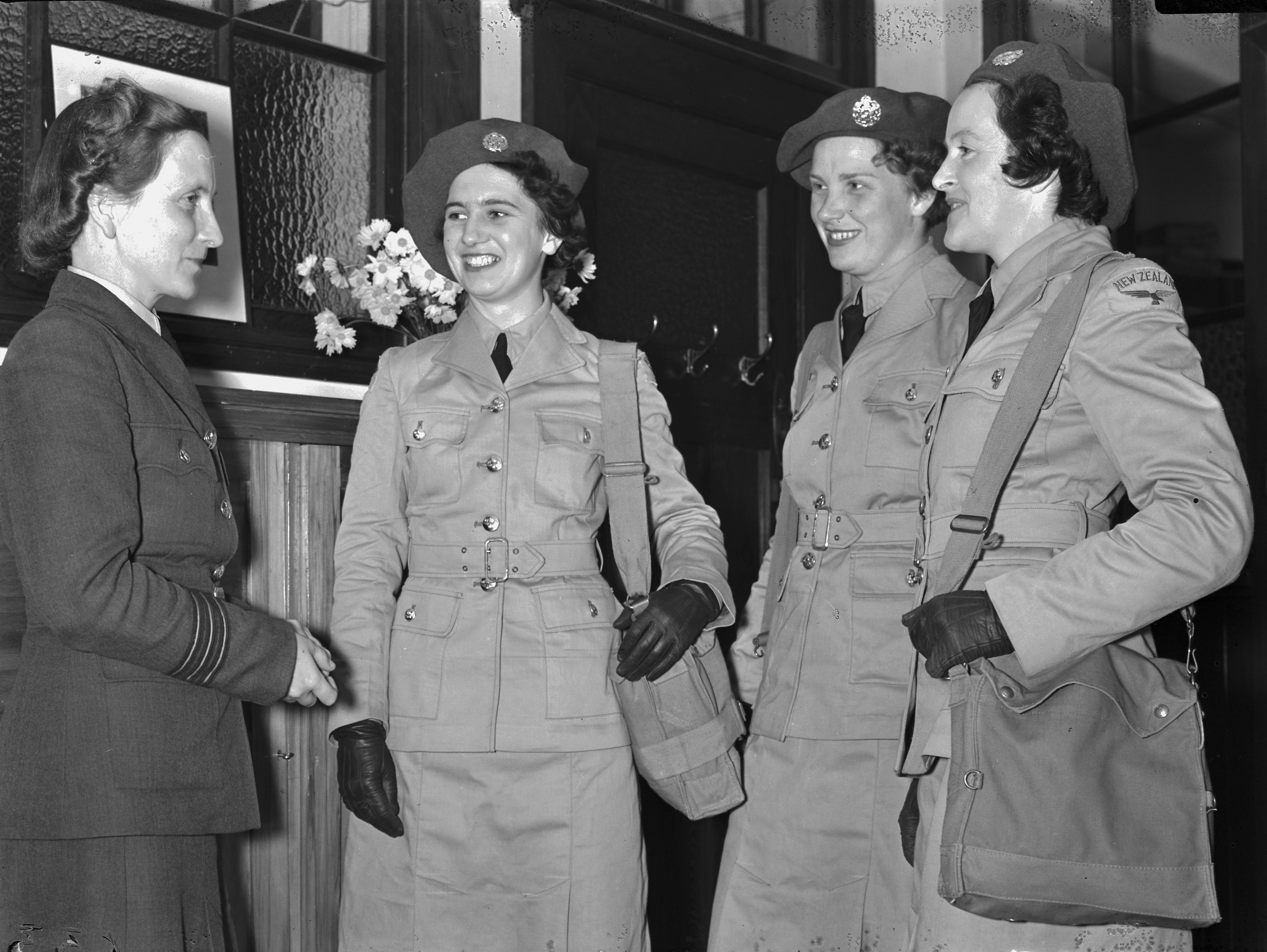
Kitty Kain, the commander of the Women's Auxiliary Air Force, on the left, with WAAFs destined for service overseas, 1942

As the war continued the categories of trades open to WAAFs increased from 7 to 39. Many jobs undertaken by the WAAF required specialised training. One of the most rigorous was the seamanship course to serve in the Air Force's marine section. WAAFs were required to "be able to handle any type of craft, from small dinghies to a whaleboat, or a 25-knot motor launch, recognise running faults and do running repairs", they needed to learn navigation by chart and compass, as well as methods of salvaging marine craft, beaching them for repairs, laying and picking up temporary moorings for aircraft, sweeping for lost torpedoes. They had also to learn visual signalling, first aid and artificial respiration, and pass a swimming test, covering 50 yards (46 m) fully clothed. The only WAAFs to fly were those learning to be radio operators at Wigram, who were taken on training flights in order to see at first hand the situation of aircrew with whom they would be exchanging signals. From early 1943 WAAFs began to replace men in certain technical trades. They went through the same training and passed the same trade tests as the men.

== Post-war ==
The majority of WAAFs were quickly demobilised after the end of the war in 1945, but a small number remained, and under the terms of the Air Force Amendment Act 1947 became a permanent part of the peacetime establishment of the RNZAF. In 1954 the WAAF was renamed the Women's Royal New Zealand Air Force. In July 1977 the WRNZAF was dissolved and all members were integrated into the RNZAF, gaining equal pay and employment rights, and access to more trades and training. Restrictions on women serving as aircrew were lifted in the 1980s, and the first female pilot qualified in 1988. By 2008 there were four female wing commanders and one group captain. In March 2016 17% of RNZAF personnel were women.

== See also ==
- Women in World War II
- Women's Auxiliary Air Force (UK)
- Women's Auxiliary Australian Air Force
- Royal Canadian Air Force Women's Division
