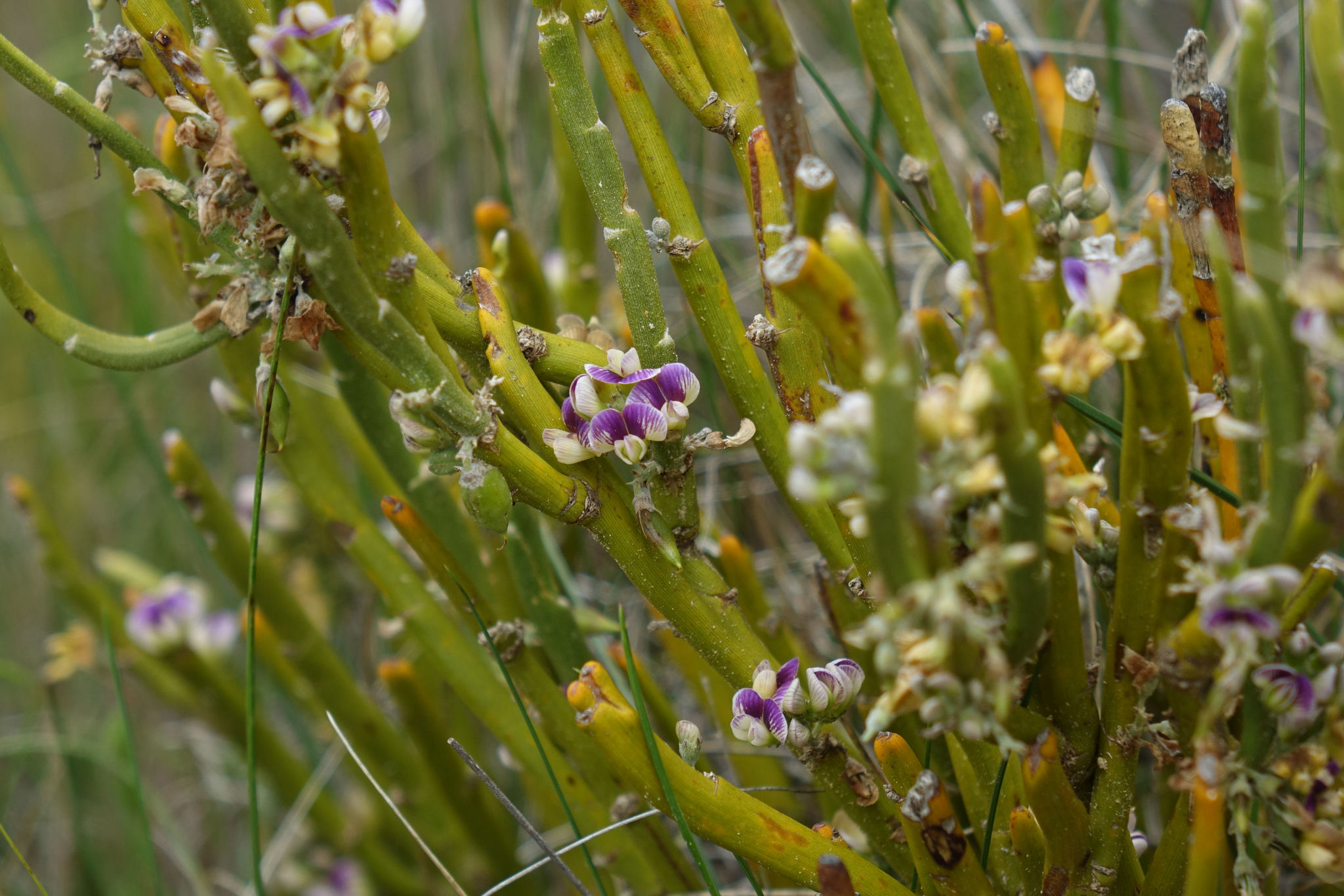

Conservation status
- Nationally Critical (NZ TCS)

Scientific classification
- Kingdom: Plantae
- Clade: Embryophytes
- Clade: Tracheophytes
- Clade: Angiosperms
- Clade: Eudicots
- Clade: Rosids
- Order: Fabales
- Family: Fabaceae
- Subfamily: Faboideae
- Genus: Carmichaelia
- Species: C. hollowayi

Binomial name
- Carmichaelia hollowayi G.Simpson
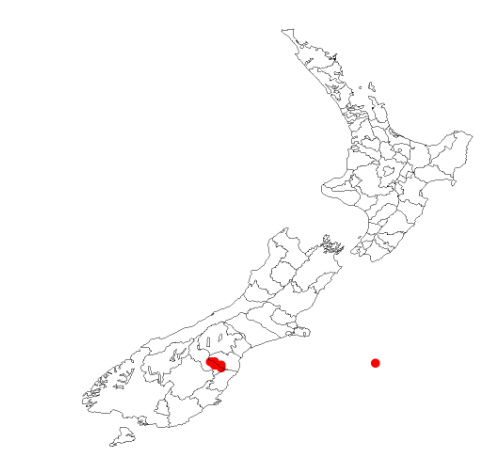
- Occurrence data from AVH

= Carmichaelia hollowayi =

Species of flowering plant

Carmichaelia hollowayi, commonly known as Holloway's broom, is a species of plant in the family Fabaceae. It is found only in the South Island of New Zealand. Its conservation status (2018) is "Nationally Critical" under the New Zealand Threat Classification System.

== Description ==
Carmichaelia hollowayi is a low-growing shrub (50–60 cm high), first growing as an erect shrub but later its stems trail and spread across the ground.

== Taxonomy ==
The species was first described by George Simpson in 1945. The earliest record in AVH, CHR 45804 was collected by Simpson in 1937 somewhere in Otago.

== Habitat ==
It grows on limestone (which Simpson described as sandstone).
