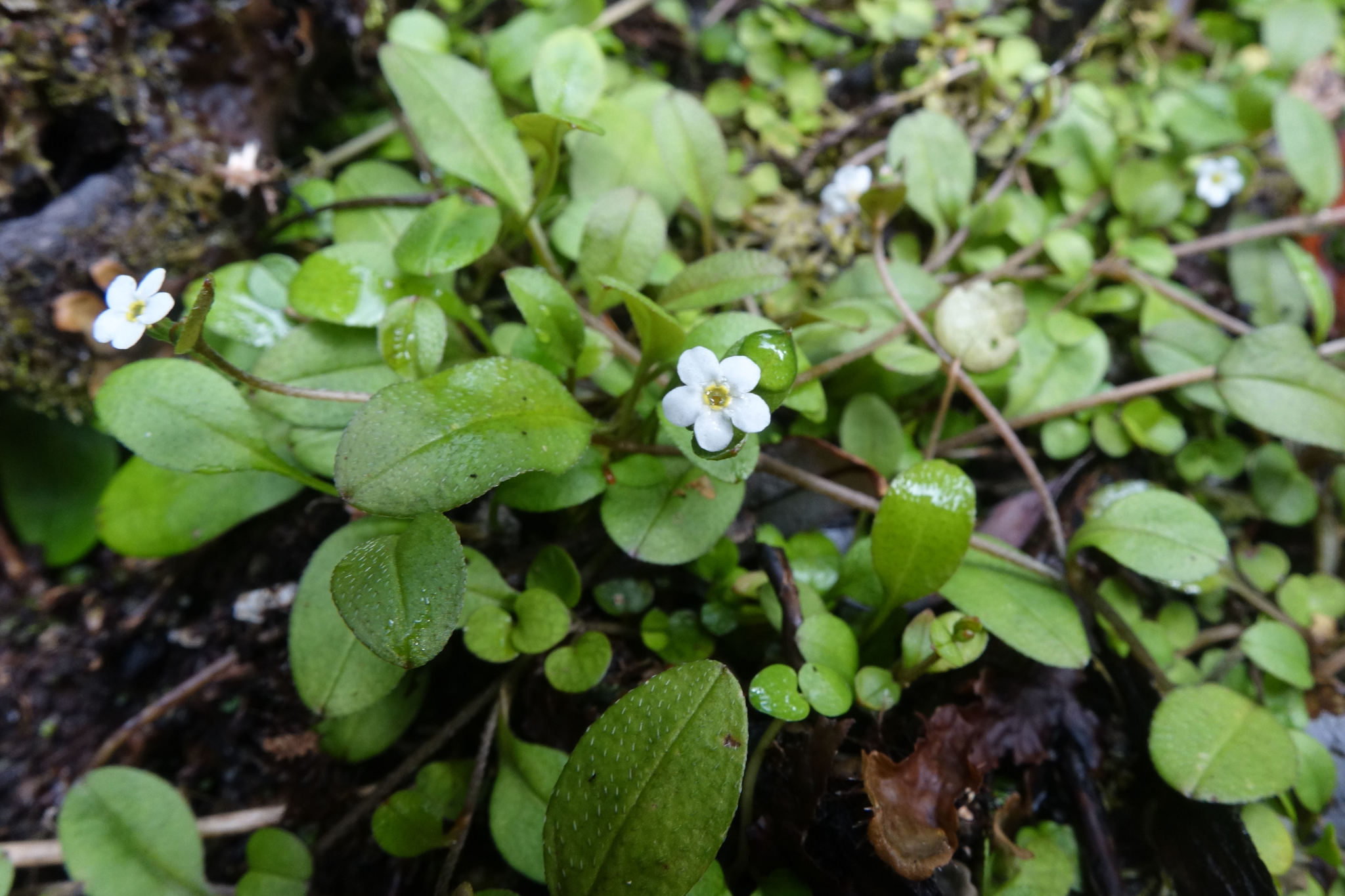
- Myosotis tenericaulus plant in flower

Conservation status
- Naturally Uncommon (NZ TCS)

Scientific classification
- Kingdom: Plantae
- Clade: Tracheophytes
- Clade: Angiosperms
- Clade: Eudicots
- Clade: Asterids
- Order: Boraginales
- Family: Boraginaceae
- Genus: Myosotis
- Species: M. tenericaulis

Binomial name
- Myosotis tenericaulis Donald Petrie

= Myosotis tenericaulis =

Species of flowering plant

Myosotis tenericaulis is a species of flowering plant in the family Boraginaceae, endemic to New Zealand. Donald Petrie described the species in 1918. Plants of this species of forget-me-not are perennial rosettes with creeping, sprawling bracteate inflorescences and white corollas.

== Description ==
Myosotis tenericaulis plants are rosettes. The rosette leaves have petioles 4–35 (or rarely up to 65) mm long. The rosette leaf blades are 4–24 mm long by 2–15 mm wide (length: width ratio 1.5–2.6: 1), usually oblanceolate to obovate or elliptic, widest at or above the middle, with an obtuse apex. Both surfaces of the leaf are sparsely to densely covered in straight, short, appressed, antrorse (forward-facing) hairs that are oriented at an angle (upper surface) or parallel (lower surface) relative to the mid vein. Sometimes the lower surface of the leaf is glabrous. Each rosette has 2–10 sprawling, creeping, prostrate, unbranched or once-branched bracteate inflorescences that are 74–410 mm long. The cauline leaves (sometimes called bracts) are very similar to the rosette leaves, but are smaller and become even smaller and sessile toward the tip of the inflorescence.

The flowers are 6–14 per inflorescence and each is borne on a short pedicel and associated with a bract. The calyx is 1–2.5 mm long at flowering and 2–3 mm long at fruiting, deeply lobed to two-thirds or more of its length, and densely covered in short, straight, appressed (few patent), antrorse hairs. The corolla is white and 2–4 mm in diameter, with a cylindrical tube, petals that are narrowly to very broadly obovate, and flat, and white or yellow scales alternating with the petals. The anthers are mostly included, with the tips only reaching or surpassing the faucal scales. The four smooth, shiny, usually light to medium brown nutlets are 1.3–1.7 mm long by 0.9–1.2 mm wide and ovoid in shape.

Myosotis tenericaulis has M. australis type pollen. Myosotis tenericaulis flowers and fruits from October–March, with the main flowering period from December–February and the main fruiting period from January–March.

=== Gallery ===
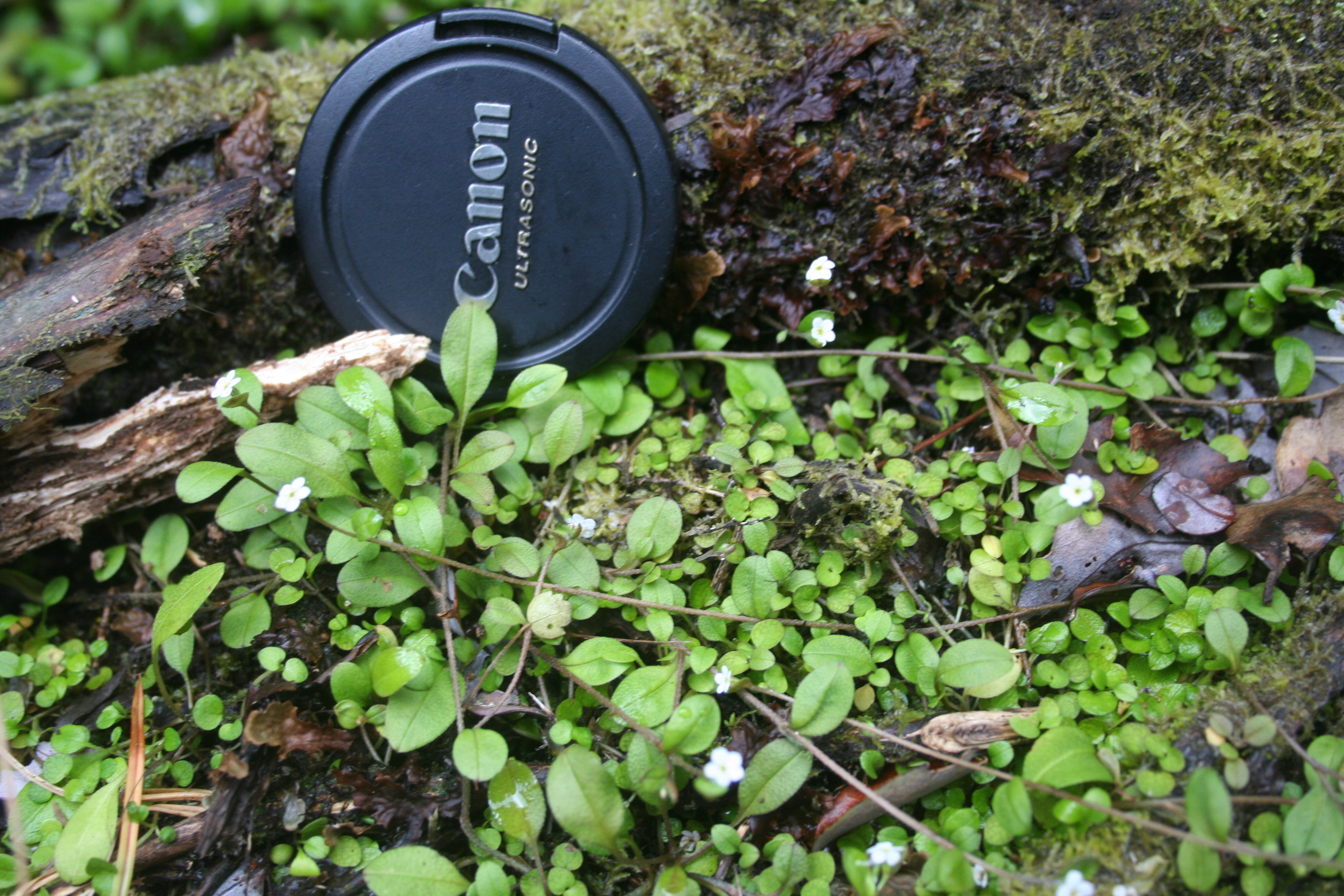
Whole plant in flower

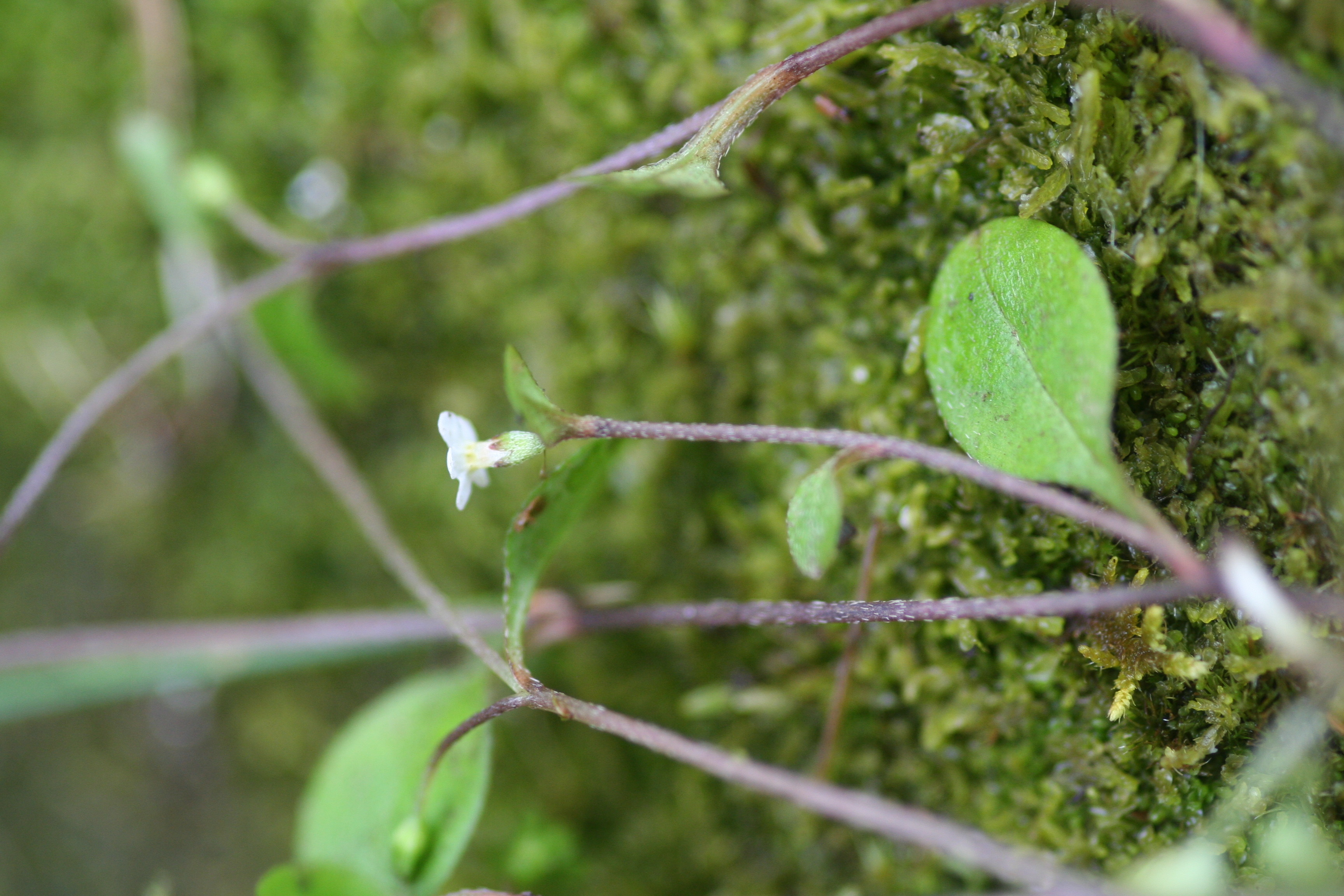
Close-up of flower

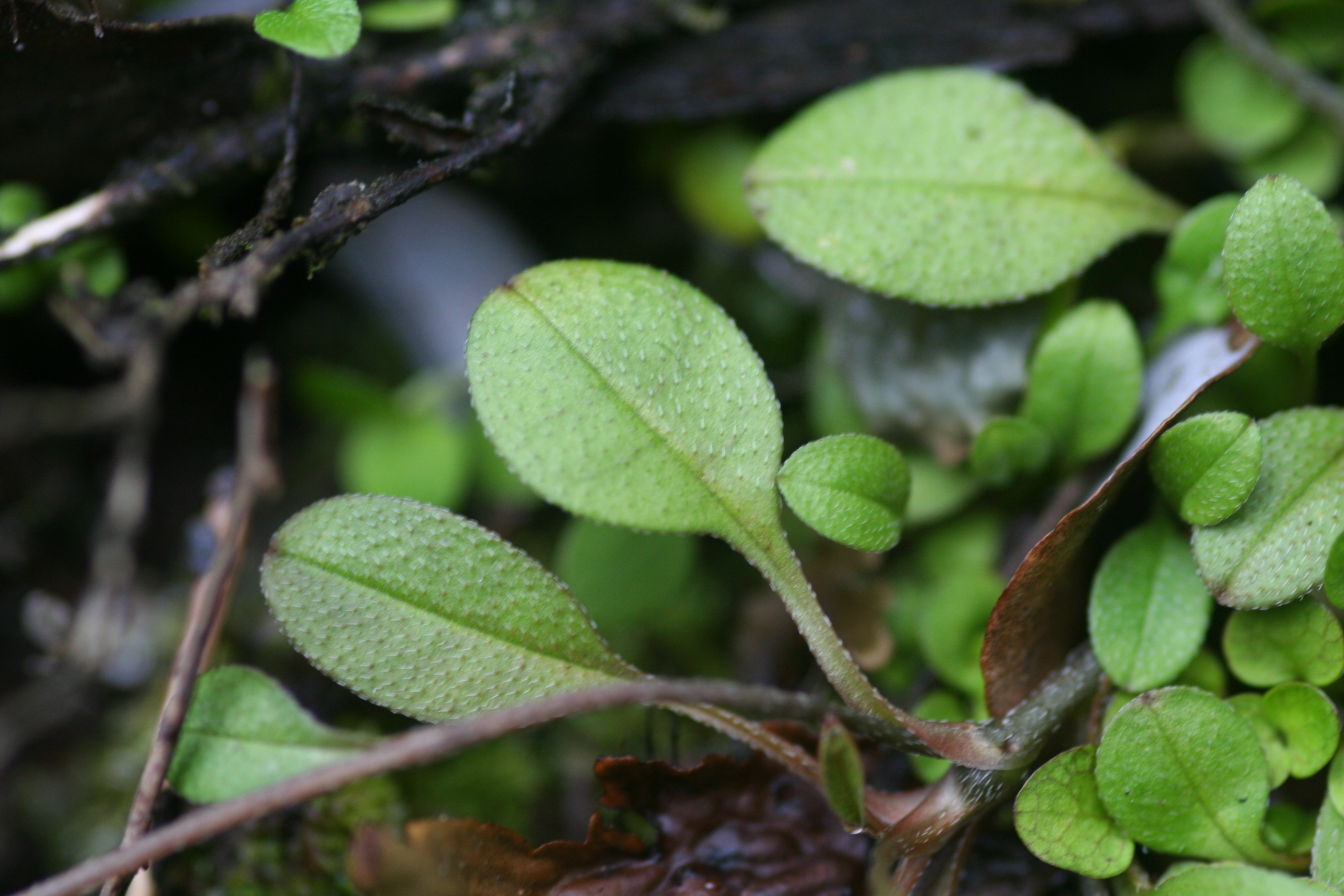
Leaves

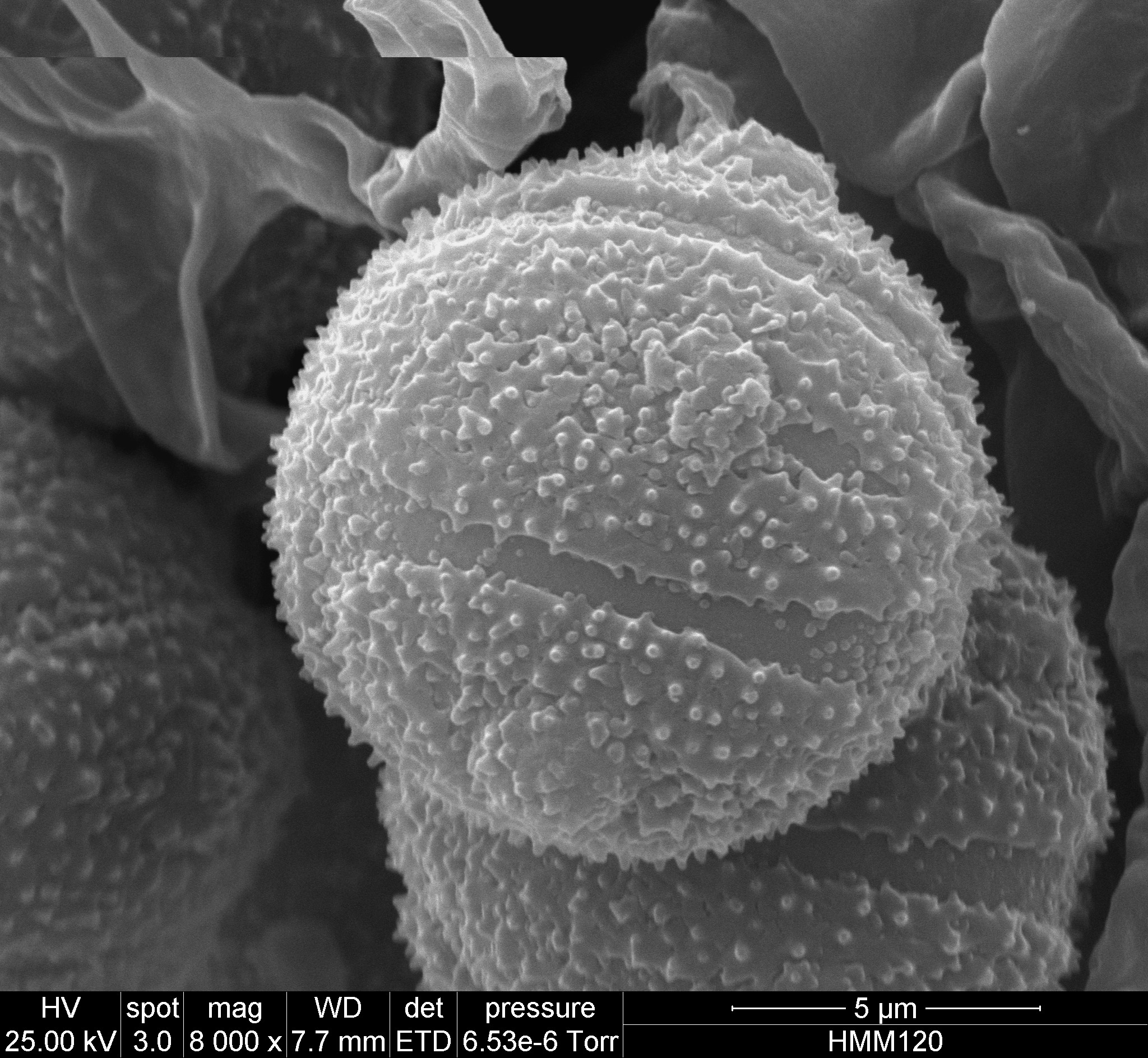
SEM image of pollen of ''M. tenericaulis''

== Taxonomy ==
Myosotis tenericaulis is in the plant family Boraginaceae and was originally described in 1918 by Donald Petrie. Myosotis tenericaulis is morphologically most similar to the other creeping, bracteate-prostrate species from the southern hemisphere, including M. matthewsii, M. chaffeyorum and M. spatulata (all from New Zealand) and especially M. albiflora (from southern Chile and Argentina). It can be distinguished from M. albiflora by its smaller nutlets (< 1.8 mm long vs. > 1.8 mm long), styles that are usually longer than the calyx at flowering (ratio of the pistil length : calyx length is usually > 1 : 1 vs. < 1 : 1), and shorter stamens (< 2.7 mm vs. > 2.7 mm long).

The lectotype specimen of Myosotis tenericaulis was selected by Lucy Moore and is lodged at the Museum of New Zealand Te Papa Tongarewa (herbarium WELT), with an isolectotype at the Allan Herbarium (CHR), Manaaki Whenua - Landcare Research.

=== Etymology ===
The specific epithet, tenericaulis, refers to the stem (Latin: caulis), which is soft and delicate (Latin: tener), referring to the ‘very thin and flaccid’ inflorescences of this species.

=== Phylogeny ===
Myosotis tenericaulis was shown to be a part of the monophyletic southern hemisphere lineage of Myosotis in phylogenetic analyses of standard DNA sequencing markers (nuclear ribosomal DNA and chloroplast DNA regions). The sole individual of M. tenericaulis that were sequenced showed that this species was sister to the sole individual of M. albiflora in the analysis of nuclear ribosomal DNA. However species relationships within the southern hemisphere lineage in general were not well resolved.

== Distribution and habitat ==
Myosotis tenericaulis is endemic to New Zealand, found on all three main islands (North, South and Stewart Islands), from sea level to 1160 m ASL elevation. On the North Island it is found in the ecological district of Southern North Island only, whereas on the South Island it is known from Western Nelson, Sounds-Nelson, Westland, Otago, Southland, and Fiordland.

M. tenericaulis is found in shady, wet places in grassland, shrubland or forest.

== Conservation status ==
The species is listed as At Risk - Naturally Uncommon in the most recent assessment (2017-2018) of the New Zealand Threatened Classification for plants. It also has the qualifiers "DP" (Data Poor), and "Sp" (Sparse).
