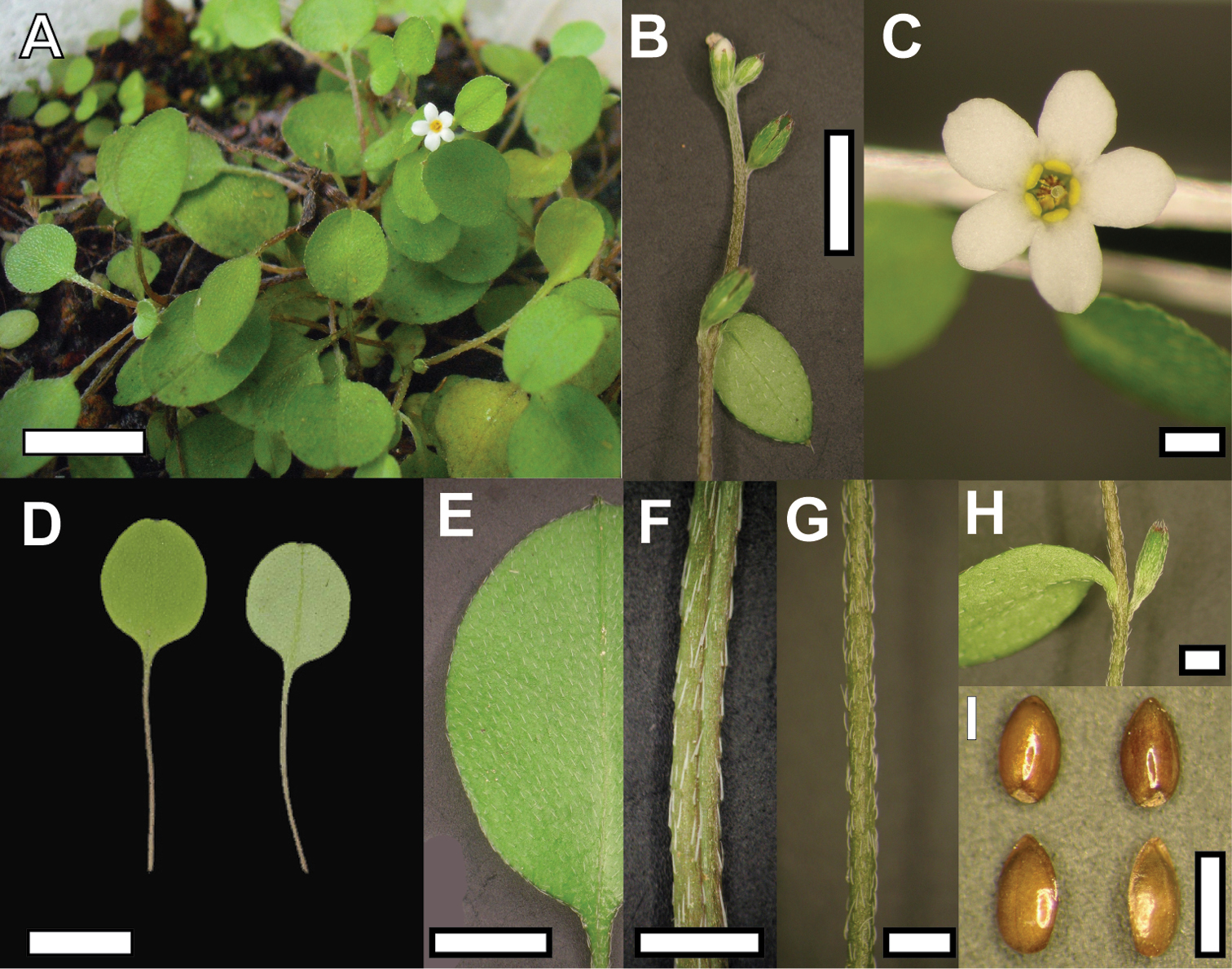
- Vegetative and reproductive features of M. chaffeyorum

Conservation status
- Nationally Vulnerable (NZ TCS)

Scientific classification
- Kingdom: Plantae
- Clade: Tracheophytes
- Clade: Angiosperms
- Clade: Eudicots
- Clade: Asterids
- Order: Boraginales
- Family: Boraginaceae
- Genus: Myosotis
- Species: M. chaffeyorum

Binomial name
- Myosotis chaffeyorum Lehnebach

= Myosotis chaffeyorum =

Species of flowering plant

Myosotis chaffeyorum is a species of flowering plant in the family Boraginaceae, endemic to the South Island of New Zealand. Carlos Lehnebach described the species in 2012. Plants of this species of forget-me-not are perennial with a creeping habit, bracteate inflorescences, and white corollas.

== Description ==
M. chaffeyorum plants are single rosettes. The rosette leaves have petioles 5–29 mm long. The rosette leaf blades are 4–17 mm long by 3–16 mm wide (length: width ratio 1.1–1:5 1), broadly elliptic, orbicular, obovate or very broadly obovate, widest at or above the middle, with an obtuse apex. The upper surface of the leaf is densely covered in straight, appressed, antrorse (forward-facing) hairs that are angled away from the mid vein, while on the lower surface the hairs are the same but oriented parallel to the mid vein. Each rosette has 3–7 sprawling, creeping, ascending or prostrate, unbranched or branched, bracteate inflorescences that are 13–23 cm long. The cauline leaves on the lower part of the inflorescence are similar to but smaller than the rosette leaves, and decrease in size toward the tip. There can be up to 17 flowers in each inflorescence, each one borne on a short pedicel and with a bract.

The calyx is 2–3 mm long at flowering and 3–4 mm long at fruiting, lobed to slightly more than half of its length, and densely covered in short, straight, antrorse hairs. The corolla is white up to 5 mm in diameter, with a cylindrical tube, petals that are rounded and flat, and small yellow scales alternating with the petals. The anthers are partly exserted, with the tips or the upper half only surpassing the scales. The four smooth, shiny, brown or dark brown nutlets are 1.2–1.5 mm long by 0.8–0.9 mm wide and ovoid in shape. M. chaffeyorum has M. uniflora type pollen. It flowers from October to February and fruits in January and February.

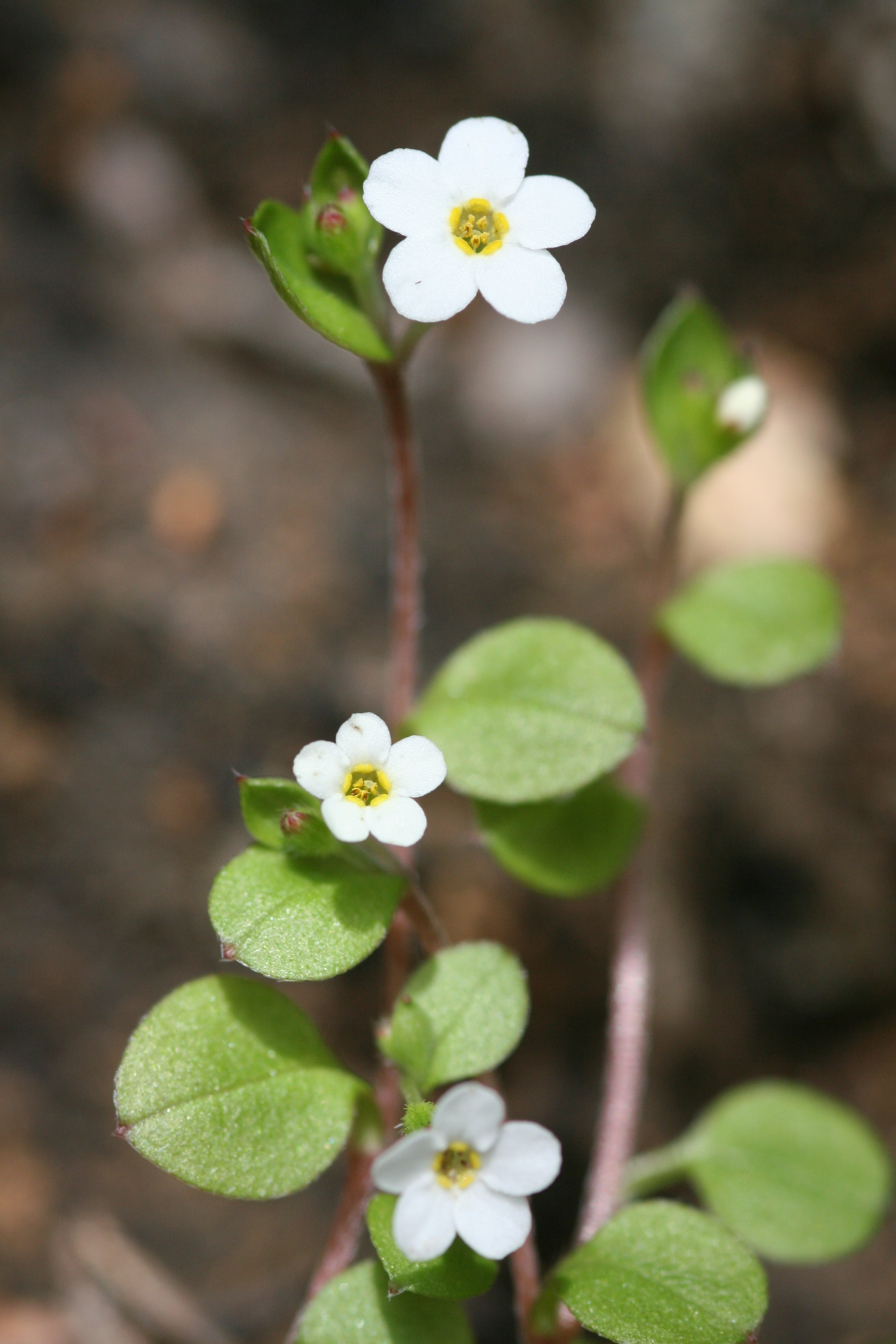
Floral detail

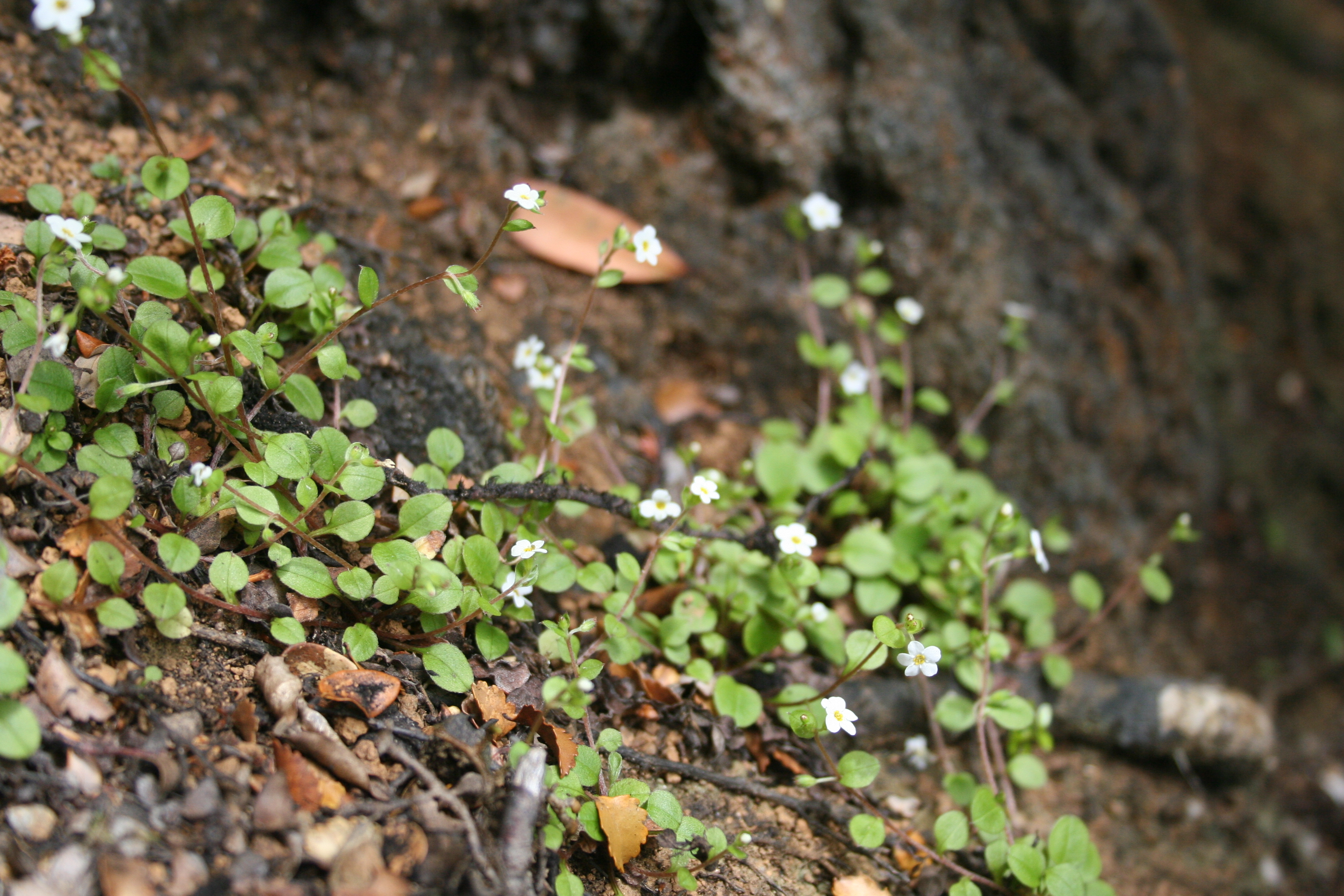
Habit

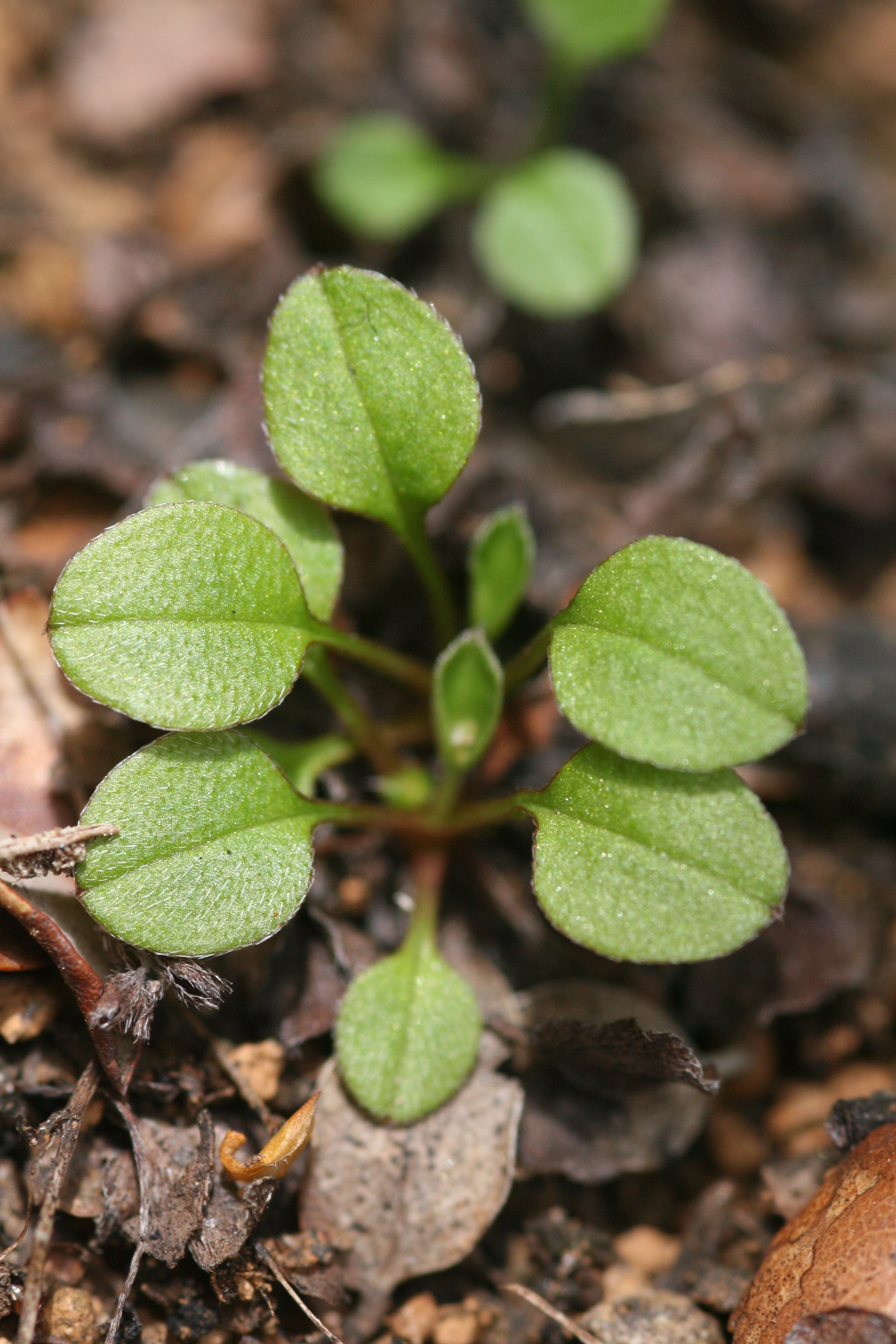
Rosette leaves

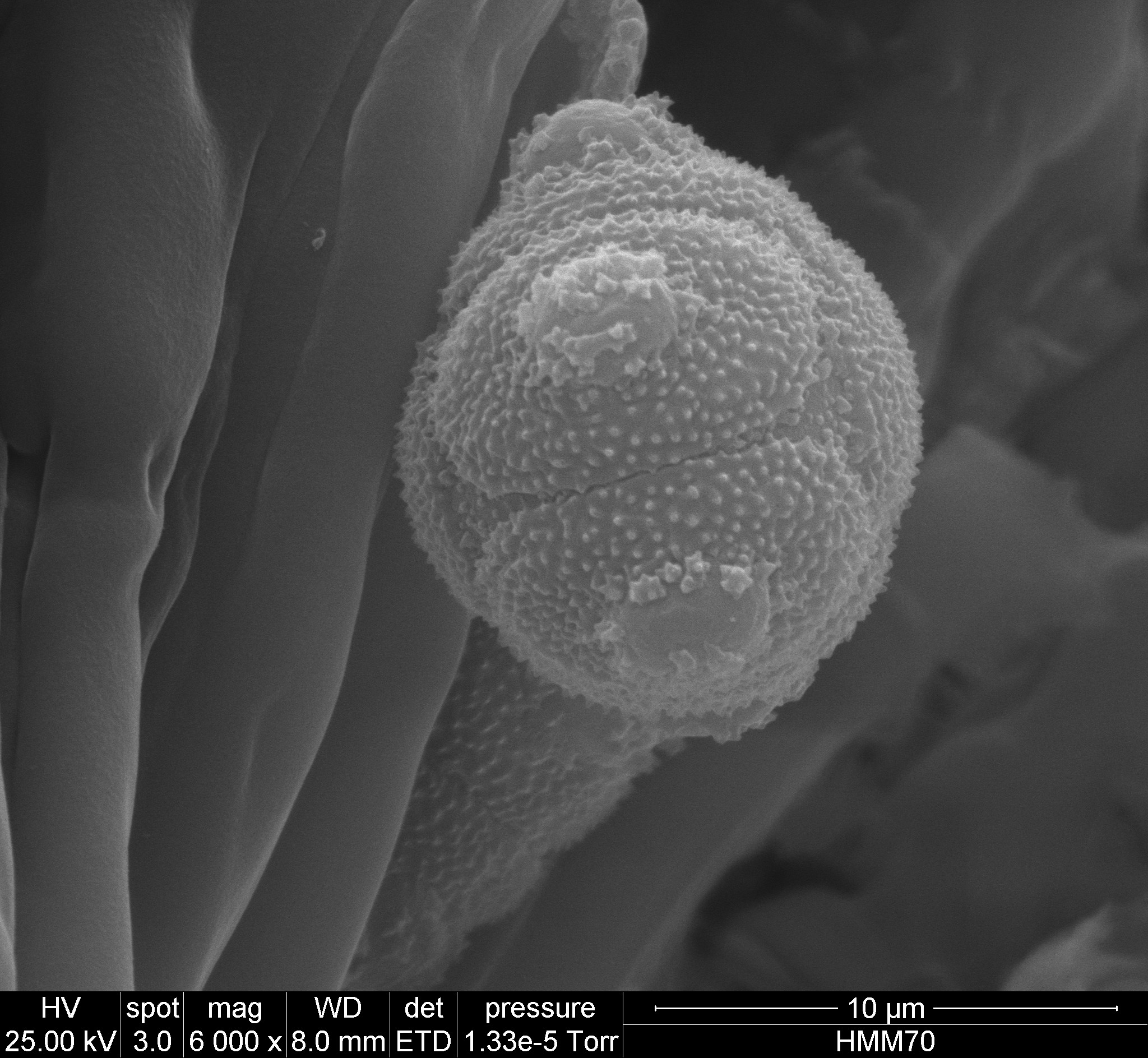
Pollen grain

== Taxonomy ==
M. chaffeyorum is in the plant family Boraginaceae and was originally described in 2012 by Carlos Lehnebach. M. chaffeyorum is morphologically most similar to the other creeping, bracteate-prostrate species, M. spatulata, M. matthewsii, M. tenericaulis and M. albiflora. It can be differentiated from the first two by the following characteristics: anthers fully included or anther tips just reaching faucal scales, filaments < 0.5 mm, and lack of hooked trichomes on the base of calyx. M. chaffeyorum can be distinguished from M. tenericaulis and M. albiflora by the length : width ratio of the rosette leaf lamina (1.0–1.4 : 1 vs. 1.5–3.6 : 1), partially included anthers with tips only surpassing the faucal scales (vs. fully included anthers wholly below the scales), longer filaments (0.3–0.5 v. 0.0–0.3 mm), and seeds that are often darker in colour (medium to dark brown v. light to medium brown).

The type specimen of M. chaffeyorum is lodged at the Allan Herbarium (CHR) of Manaaki Whenua - Landcare Research, Lincoln. Anthony Druce collected the type specimen of this species from Takaka Valley in north-west Nelson in 1977.

The specific epithet, chaffeyorum, is named after two people: Annie Selina Chaffey (1877–1953) and Henry Fox Chaffey (1868–1951) who lived in the area where this species is found.

=== Phylogeny ===
M. chaffeyorum was shown to be a part of the monophyletic southern hemisphere lineage of Myosotis in phylogenetic analyses of standard DNA sequencing markers (nuclear ribosomal DNA and chloroplast DNA regions). Within the southern hemisphere lineage, species relationships were not well resolved. The sequences of M. chaffeyorum grouped with individuals of other northern South Island species in both datasets, as well as some North Island species in the nuclear ribosomal DNA dataset.

A 2025 phylogenomic study based on DNA from whole plastids, target capture of universal angiosperm bait markers, and the full nuclear ribosomal DNA cistron, included three individuals of M. chaffeyorum. In that study, M. chaffeyorum, together with two other few-flowered, bracteate-prostrate creeping species, M. spatulata and M. matthewsii, were found to be closely related to ebracteate-erect species, especially M. brockiei, M. forsteri, M. laeta, M. pansa, and M. venosa.

== Distribution and habitat ==
M. chaffeyorum is endemic to the South Island of New Zealand in Western Nelson, Sounds-Nelson and Marlborough, from (50–)550–1100 m elevation. M. chaffeyorum is found on limestone, marble or ultramafic bluffs and rocks, usually on bare, dry soils, in shady places. It is considered to be an obligate calcicole.

== Conservation status ==
The species is listed as Threatened - Vulnerable in the most recent assessment (2023) of the New Zealand Threatened Classification for plants. It also has the qualifiers "DP" (Data Poor), "RR" (Sparse) and "Sp" (Sparse). This status is an improvement from Threatened - Nationally Critical listing in the 2017 assessment.
