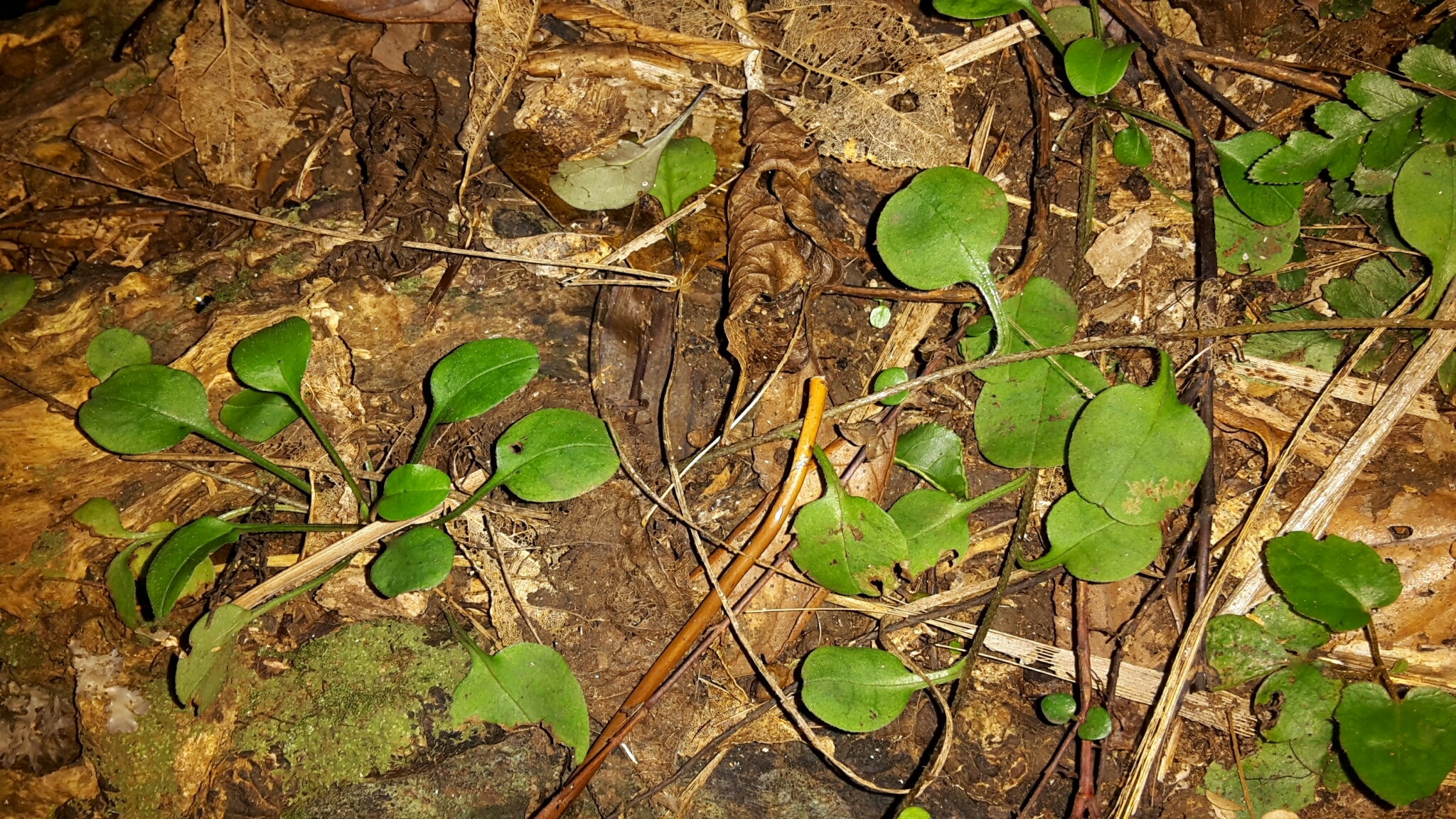

Conservation status
- Nationally Critical (NZ TCS)

Scientific classification
- Kingdom: Plantae
- Clade: Tracheophytes
- Clade: Angiosperms
- Clade: Eudicots
- Clade: Asterids
- Order: Boraginales
- Family: Boraginaceae
- Genus: Myosotis
- Species: M. matthewsii

Binomial name
- Myosotis matthewsii (L.B.Moore)

= Myosotis matthewsii =

Species of flowering plant

Myosotis matthewsii is a species of flowering plant in the family Boraginaceae, endemic to the North Island of New Zealand. Lucy Moore described the species in 1961. Plants of this species of forget-me-not are perennial rosettes with bracteate inflorescences and white corollas.

== Taxonomy and etymology ==
Myosotis matthewsii is in the plant family Boraginaceae and was originally described in 1961 by Lucy Moore. Myosotis matthewsii is morphologically most similar to M. spatulata, M. chaffeyorum, M. tenericaulis and M. albiflora.

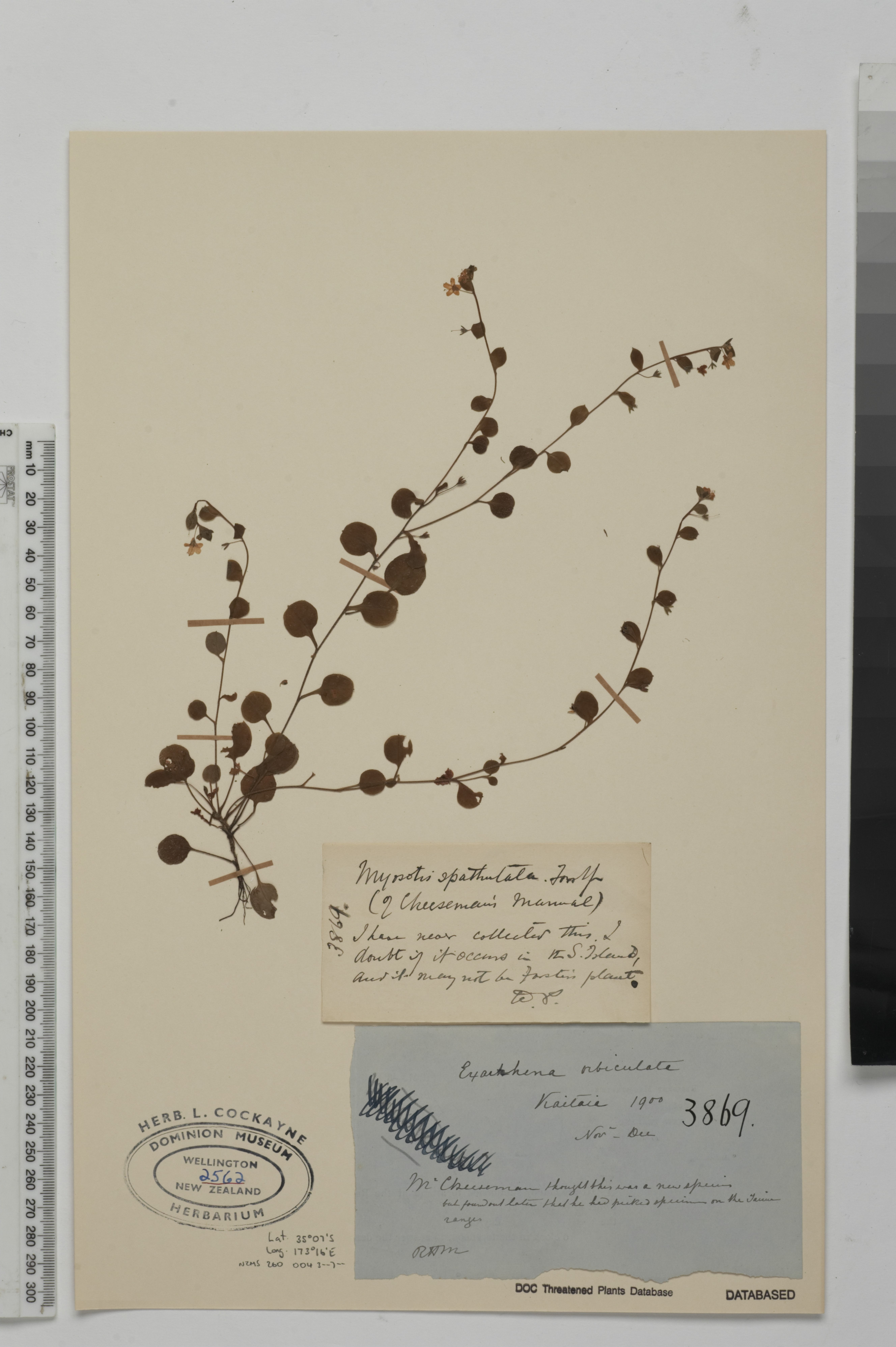
Holotype specimen of Myosotis matthewsii at Te Papa (WELT SP002562)

The type specimen of Myosotis matthewsii is lodged at the Museum of New Zealand Te Papa Tongarewa, Wellington (herbarium WELT).

The specific epithet, matthewsii, is named after Richard Henry Matthews (1835–1912), a Kaitaia resident who made the first collections.

== Phylogeny ==
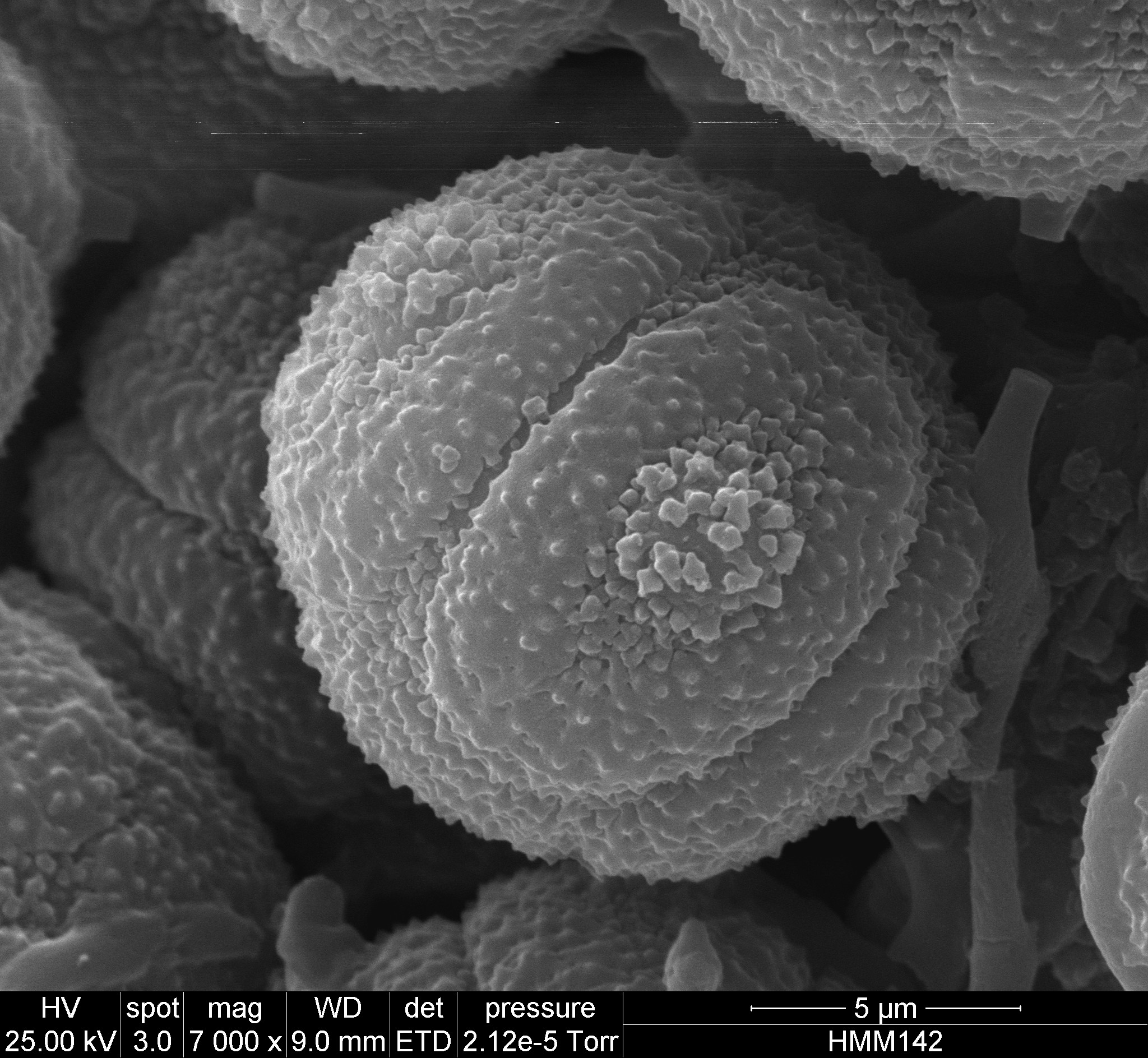
Pollen

Myosotis matthewsii was shown to be a part of the monophyletic southern hemisphere lineage of Myosotis in phylogenetic analyses of standard DNA sequencing markers (nuclear ribosomal DNA and chloroplast DNA regions). Within the southern hemisphere lineage, species relationships were not well resolved.

== Description ==
Myosotis matthewsii plants are rosettes. The rosette leaves have petioles 7–62 mm long. The rosette leaf blades are 6–22 mm long by 5–20 mm wide (length: width ratio 1.1–1.3: 1), broadly to very broadly obovate, widest at or above the middle, with an obtuse apex. Both surfaces of the leaf are sparsely to densely covered in straight, appressed (also some patent on upper surface only), antrorse (forward-facing) hairs that are oriented at an angle (upper surface) or parallel (lower surface) relative to the mid vein. Each rosette has 3–6 sprawling, creeping, subascending, unbranched to thrice-branched bracteate inflorescences that are 176–420 mm long. The cauline leaves are very similar to the rosette leaves, but become smaller, can be elliptic to ovate, and may have some curved hairs. The flowers are 8–43 per inflorescence and each is borne on a short pedicel with a bract. The calyx is 2–3 mm long at flowering and 3–4 mm long at fruiting, lobed to about three-quarters of its length, and densely covered in short, straight to curved (sometimes hooked near the calyx base), appressed to patent, antrorse hairs. The corolla is white and 4–8 mm in diameter, with a cylindrical tube, petals that are broadly obovate to ovate and flat, and small yellow scales alternating with the petals. The anthers are fully exserted. The four smooth, shiny, light to dark brown nutlets are 1.4–1.8 mm long by 1.0–1.4 mm wide and ovoid to broadly ovoid in shape.

Myosotis matthewsii has M. uniflora type pollen.

The chromosome number of M. matthewsii is unknown.

Myosotis matthewsii flowers October–January, and fruits until March.

== Distribution and habitat ==
Myosotis matthewsii is endemic to the North Island of New Zealand in the Warawara Forest in Northland, from 65 to 300 m ASL. M. matthewsii is found on the forest floor in damp, shady, rocky sites of low broadleaf secondary forest.

== Conservation status ==
The species is listed as Threatened - Nationally Critical in the most recent assessment (2017-2018) of the New Zealand Threatened Classification for plants. It also has the qualifiers "DP" (Data Poor), "EF" (Extreme Fluctuations), and "OL" (One Location).
