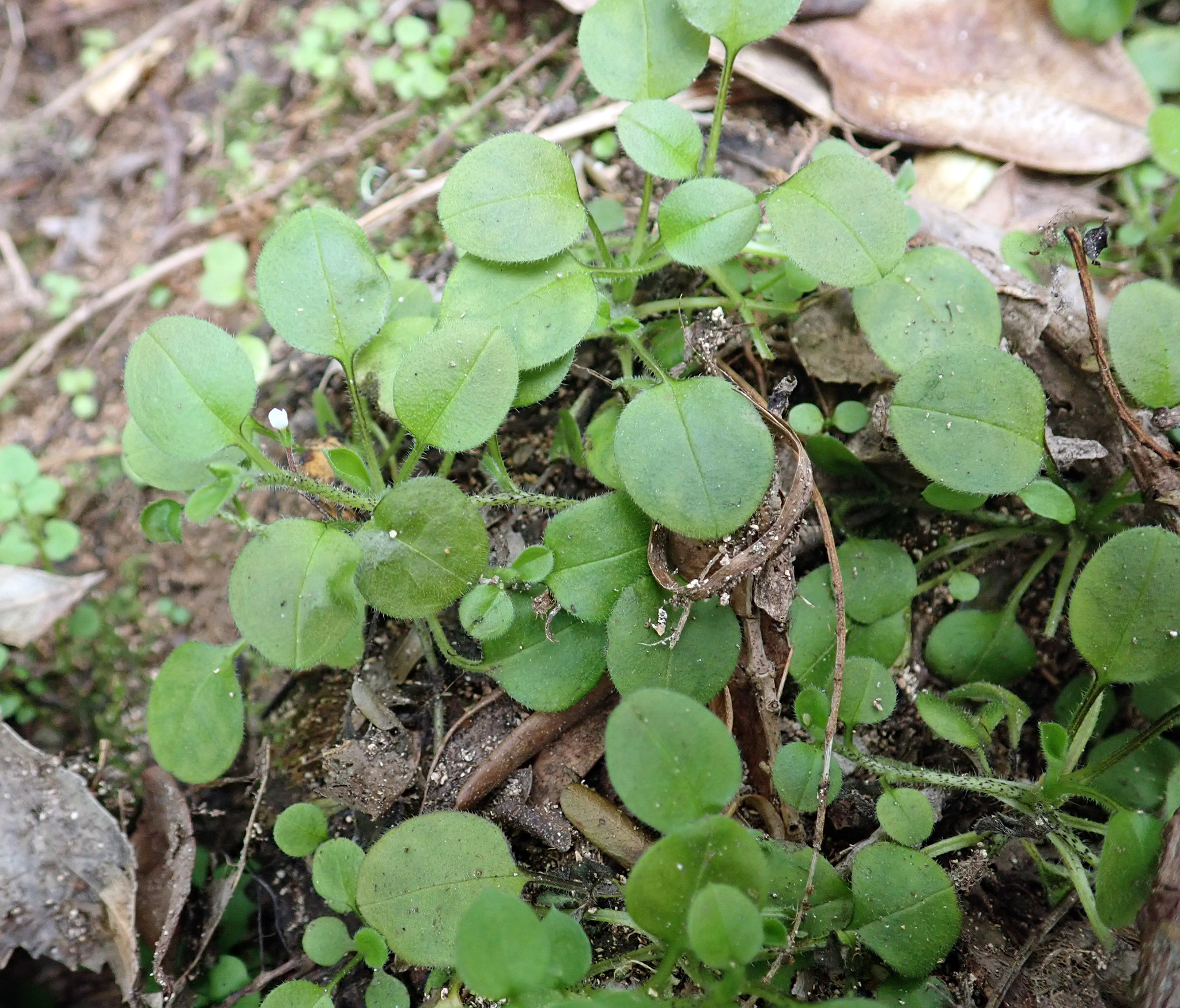
- Myosotis spatulata plant with small white flower

Conservation status
- Naturally Uncommon (NZ TCS)

Scientific classification
- Kingdom: Plantae
- Clade: Tracheophytes
- Clade: Angiosperms
- Clade: Eudicots
- Clade: Asterids
- Order: Boraginales
- Family: Boraginaceae
- Genus: Myosotis
- Species: M. spatulata

Binomial name
- Myosotis spatulata G.Forst.

= Myosotis spatulata =

Species of flowering plant

Myosotis spatulata is a species of flowering plant in the family Boraginaceae, endemic to New Zealand. Georg Forster described the species in 1786. Plants of this species of forget-me-not are perennial rosettes with bracteate inflorescences and white corollas.

M. spatulata is distributed across many plant communities in both the North and South Islands. It is listed as Naturally Uncommon by the New Zealand Threat Classification System.

== Description ==
M. spatulata plants are rosettes. The rosette leaves have petioles 4–30 mm long. The rosette leaf blades are 4–28 mm long by 3–18 mm wide (length: width ratio 0.9–1.7: 1), usually narrowly to broadly obovate, widest at or above the middle, with an obtuse apex. Both surfaces of the leaf are sparsely to densely covered in straight (some flexuous), patent, antrorse (forward-facing) hairs that are oriented at an angle (upper surface) or parallel (lower surface) relative to the mid vein. The leaf margin hairs are the same but usually appressed.

Each rosette has 2–12 sprawling, creeping, prostrate, unbranched or once-branched bracteate inflorescences that are 62–310 mm long. The cauline leaves (or bracts) are very similar to the rosette leaves, but become smaller and sessile toward the tip of the inflorescence. The flowers are 1–47 per inflorescence and each is borne on a short pedicel and associated with a bract. The calyx is 1–4 mm long at flowering and 2–4 mm long at fruiting, deeply lobed to half or all of its length, and densely covered in short, straight to flexuous (sometimes hooked near the calyx base), appressed, patent, or erect, antrorse hairs. The corolla is white and 1–5 mm in diameter, with a cylindrical tube, petals that are broadly obovate, rotund or ovate, and flat, and small, faint yellow scales alternating with the petals. The anthers are fully exserted. The four smooth, shiny, usually medium to dark brown nutlets are 1.1–1.8 mm long by 0.7–1.2 mm wide and ovoid (rarely broadly ovoid) in shape.

Myosotis spatulata has M. uniflora type pollen.

The chromosome number of M. spatulata is (2n = 46; AK 253584).

Myosotis spatulata flowers and fruits throughout the year (January–December), with the main flowering period October–March and the main fruiting period November–May.

=== Gallery ===
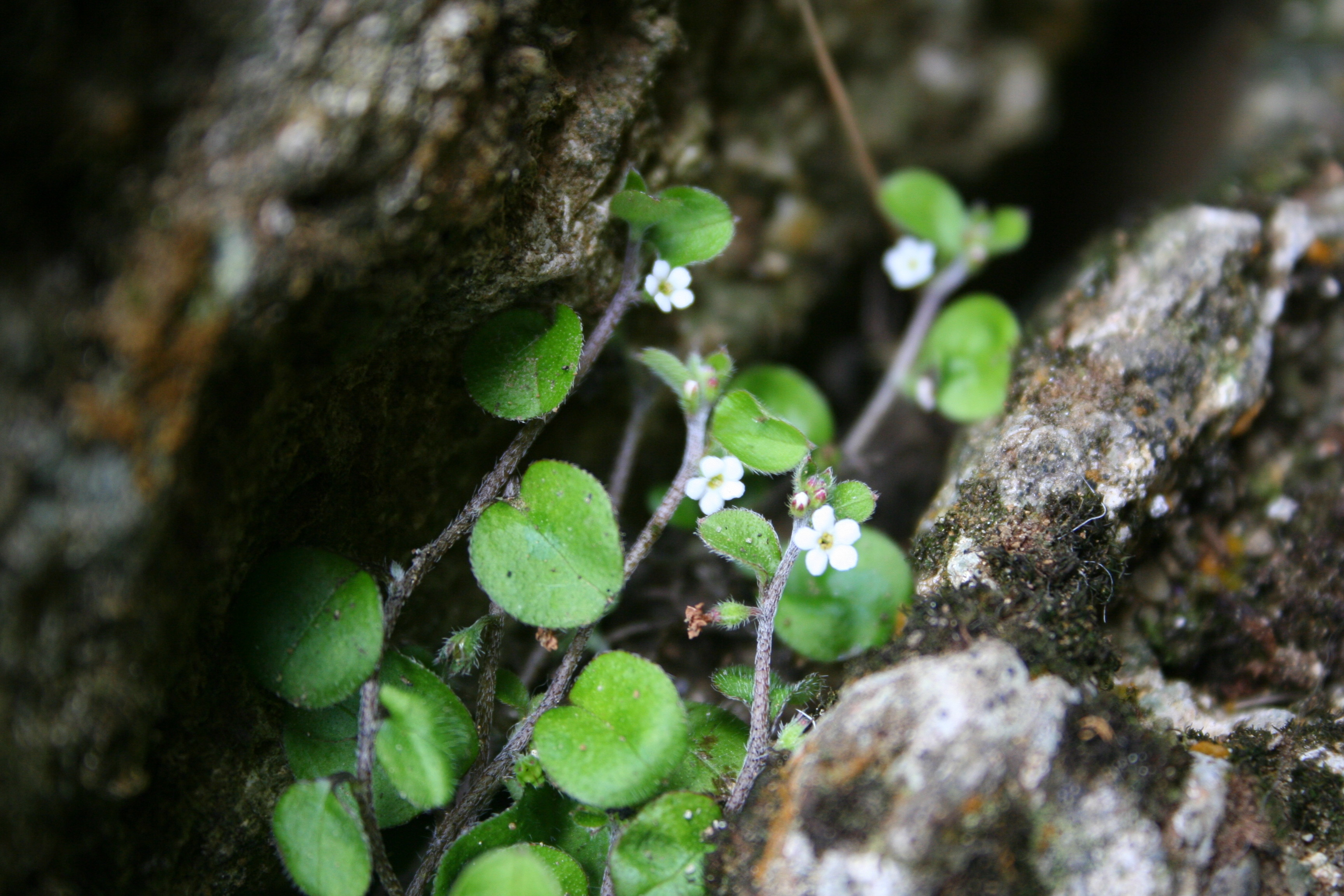
Flowering plants in rock crevice

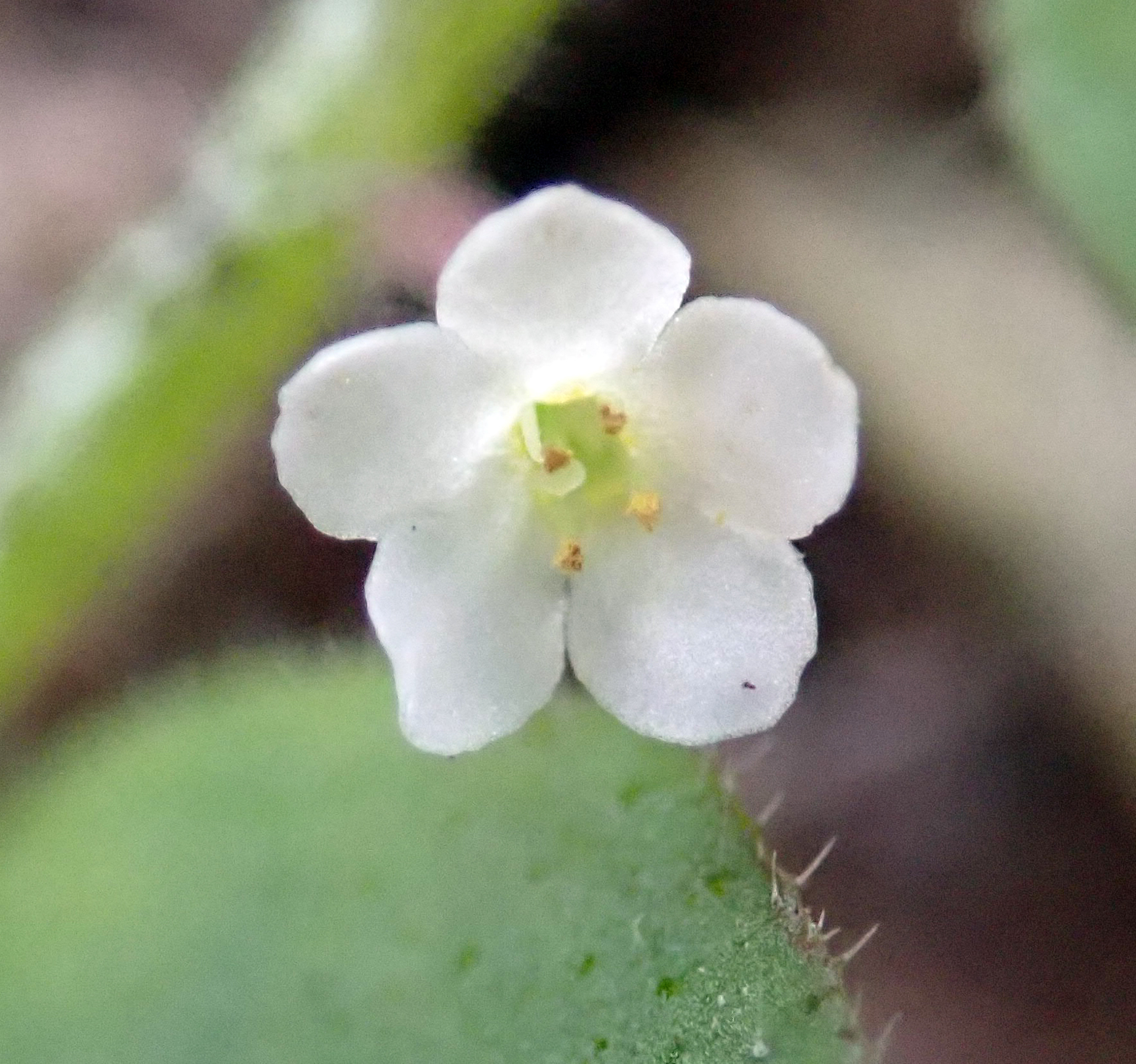
Close-up of tiny flower

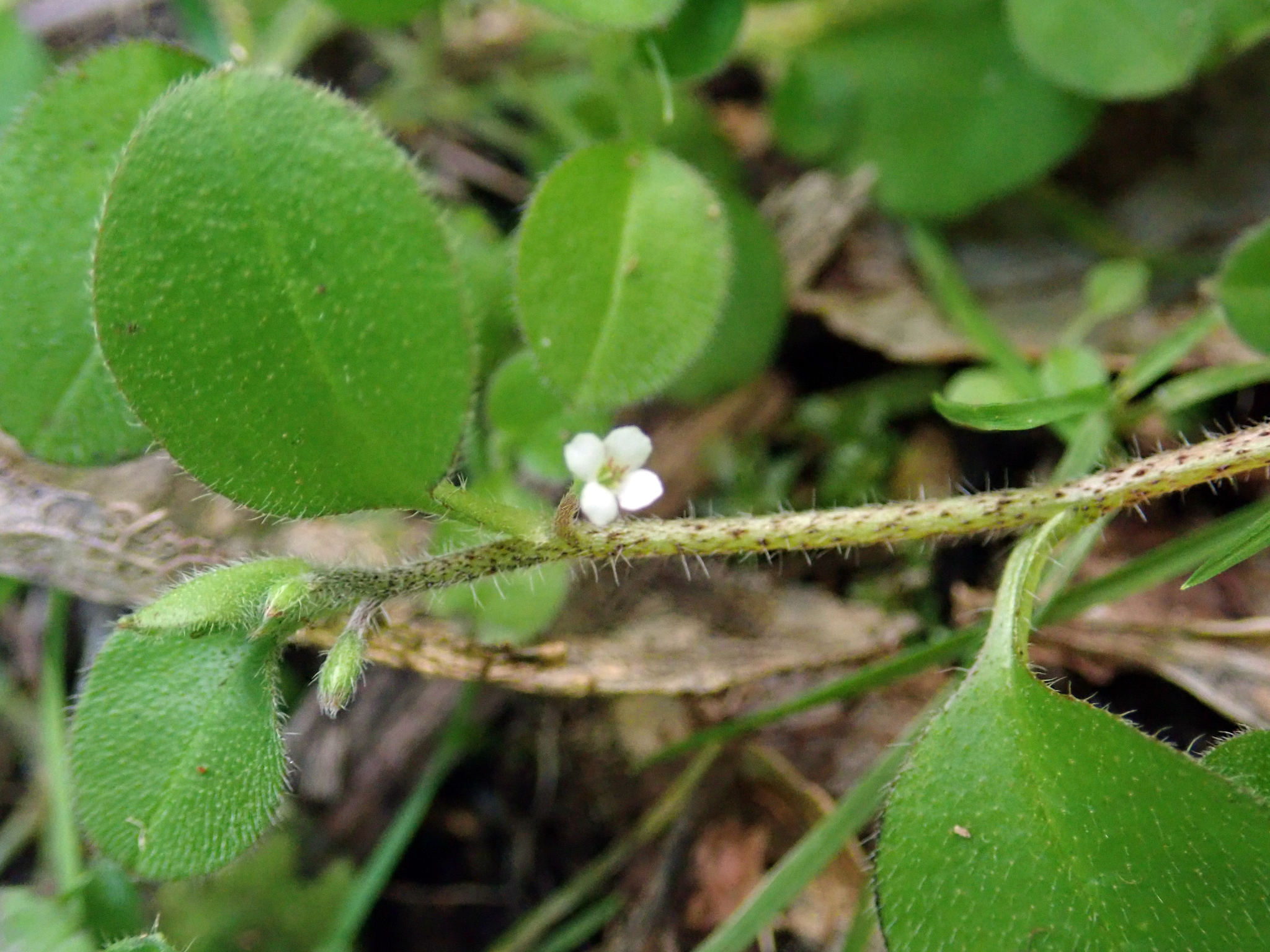
Flower and leaf showing erect hairs on branch

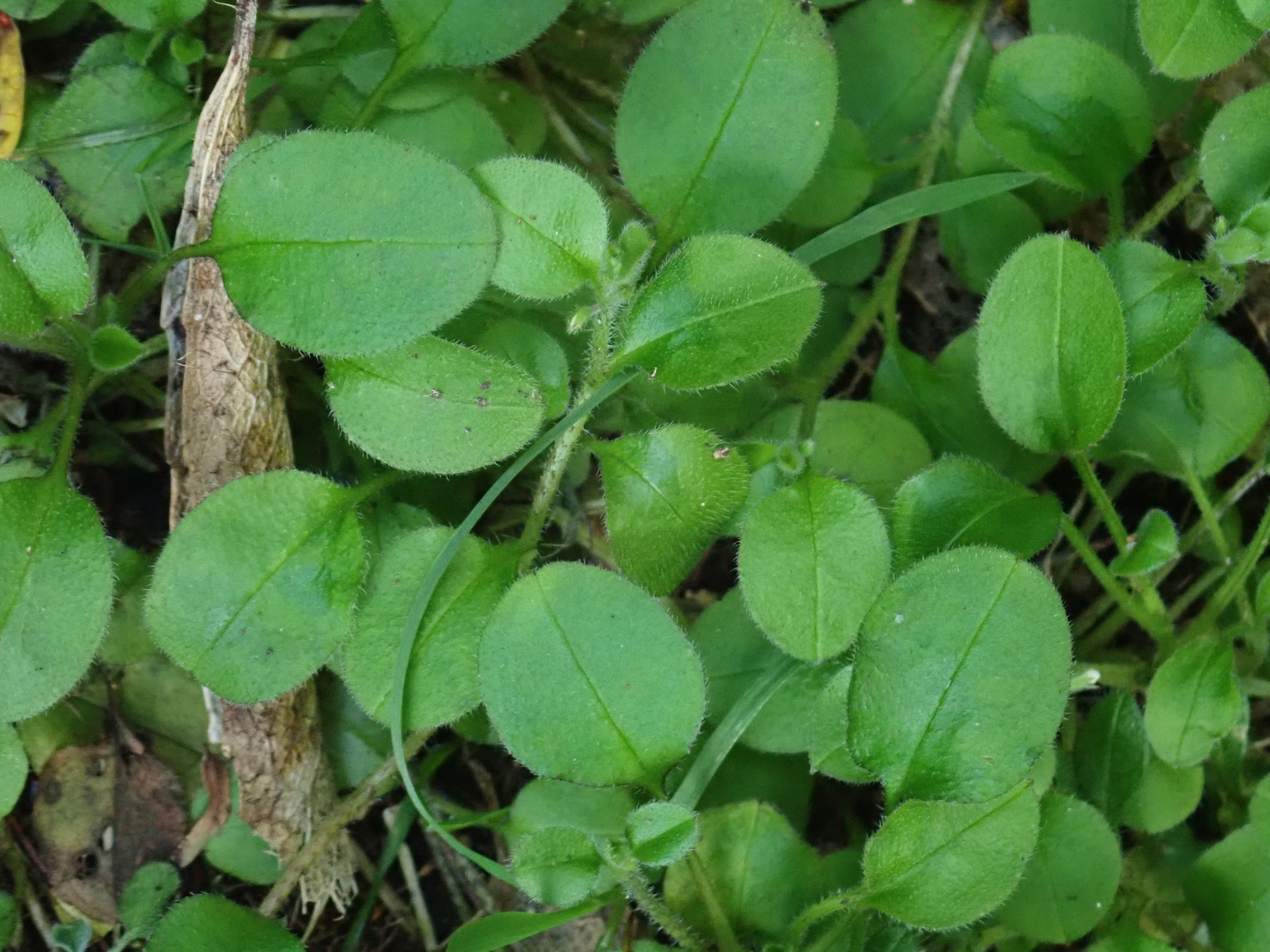
Leaves

== Taxonomy ==
Myosotis spatulata is in the plant family Boraginaceae and was originally described in 1786 by Georg Forster. Myosotis spatulata is morphologically most similar to the other creeping, bracteate-prostrate species including M. matthewsii, M. chaffeyorum, M. tenericaulis and M. albiflora. It can be distinguished from all four of these species by its mostly patent rosette leaf hairs (which are appressed in the other four species), and a filament length that is intermediate ((0.3–)0.5–1.5 mm) between M. matthewsii (which has very long filaments: 2.6–3.1 mm) and the other three species (which have very short filaments from 0.1–0.5 mm long: M. tenericaulis, M. chaffeyorum and M. albiflora). Although two varieties of M. spatulata were described, there are no morphological characters which separate them, and the varieties were not recognized in the most recent taxonomic revision.

The lectotype specimen of Myosotis spatulata was selected by Lucy Moore and is lodged at the Paris herbarium (National Museum of Natural History, France; herbarium P). There are several other specimens of original material, which were collected at Queen Charlotte Sound on Captain Cook’s second voyage (1772–1775).

The specific epithet, spatulata, refers to the leaf shape and is derived from the Greek words meaning blade (spathe) or spoon-shaped (spatulata). The spelling of the epithet by Forster is without an 'h' in the original description, i.e.: ‘M. spatulata, seiminibus laevibus, foliis spatulatis hispidis, pedunculis axillaribus, solitariis unifloris. F. Nova Zeelandia.’ Many authors since then have spelled the epithet spathulata instead of spatulata, including Robert Brown in his Prodromus.

=== Phylogeny ===
Myosotis spatulata was shown to be a part of the monophyletic southern hemisphere lineage of Myosotis in phylogenetic analyses of standard DNA sequencing markers (nuclear ribosomal DNA and chloroplast DNA regions). The three individuals of M. spatulata that were sequenced showed that this species is more closely related to the ebracteate-erect species M. forsteri and M. venosa than other bracteate-prostrate species. However the three individuals of M. spatulata did not form a monophyletic group, and species relationships within the southern hemisphere lineage in general were not well resolved.

== Distribution and habitat ==
Myosotis spatulata is endemic to New Zealand, and has a large geographical distribution throughout the North and South Islands from 0–1500 m elevation. On the North Island, it is found in: Northland, Auckland, Volcanic Plateau, Gisborne and Southern North Island; on the South Island it is known from Sounds-Nelson, Canterbury, Otago and Fiordland. It is also present on several offshore islands, including Manawatāwhi / Three Kings; Aotea / Great Barrier; Taranga / Hen and Chickens; Moutohora / Whale; and Chatham Islands.

M. spatulata is found on rocky, base-rich substrates, in dry or wet, shaded, sheltered areas in grassland, shrubland or forests.

== Conservation status ==
The species is listed as At Risk - Naturally Uncommon in the most recent assessment (2017-2018) of the New Zealand Threatened Classification for plants. It also has the qualifiers "DP" (Data Poor), "EF" (Extreme Fluctuations), and "Sp" (Sparse).
