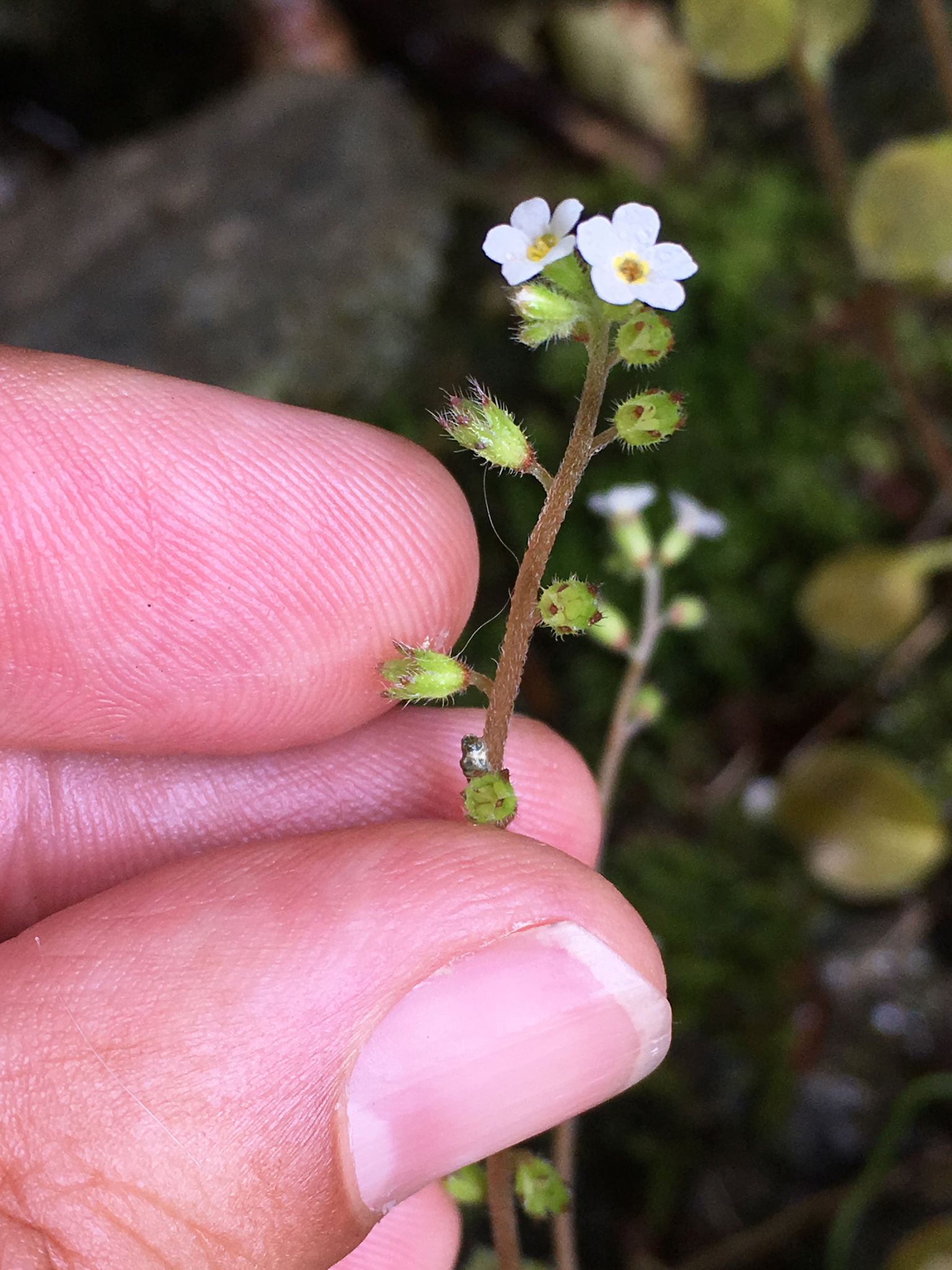
- flowering branch of Myosotis forsteri

Conservation status
- Not Threatened (NZ TCS)

Scientific classification
- Kingdom: Plantae
- Clade: Embryophytes
- Clade: Tracheophytes
- Clade: Spermatophytes
- Clade: Angiosperms
- Clade: Eudicots
- Clade: Asterids
- Order: Boraginales
- Family: Boraginaceae
- Genus: Myosotis
- Species: M. forsteri

Binomial name
- Myosotis forsteri Lehm.

Synonyms
- Myosotis hamiltonii Colenso; Myosotis polyantha Colenso; Myosotis tenuifolia Colenso

= Myosotis forsteri =

Species of flowering plant

Myosotis forsteri is a species of flowering plant in the family Boraginaceae. endemic to New Zealand. Johann Georg Christian Lehmann described the species in 1818. Plants of this species of forget-me-not are perennial rosettes with ebracteate inflorescences and white corollas with stamens that are fully included or sometimes partly exserted with the tips only surpassing the scales.

== Taxonomy and etymology ==
Myosotis forsteri Lehm. is in the plant family Boraginaceae. The species was originally described in 1818 by Johann Georg Christian Lehmann. The most recent treatment of this species was done by Lucy B. Moore in the Flora of New Zealand.

The original description lists "Nova Hollandia" [Australia] as the type locality however this is an error as M. forsteri is not found in Australia (and the collectors Johann Forster and Georg Forster did not collect plants there on the second voyage of James Cook); the correct type locality is Dusky Sound, Fiordland, New Zealand. The lectotype was designated by Carlos Lehenbach and is lodged at the herbarium MEL at the herbarium of the National Herbarium of Victoria (MEL 71187).

Myosotis forsteri is morphologically most similar to Myosotis venosa in its habit and leaves. The two species can be distinguished based on anther exsertion: in M. forsteri the anthers are usually included inside the corolla tube, whereas in M. venosa the anthers are fully exserted.

== Phylogeny ==
The five individuals of M. forsteri were shown to be included in the southern hemisphere lineage of Myosotis in phylogenetic analyses of standard DNA sequencing markers (nuclear ribosomal DNA and chloroplast DNA regions) of New Zealand Myosotis. Within the southern hemisphere lineage, species relationships were not well resolved.

Nevertheless, all of the sampled individuals clustered together (and near M. venosa) in the nuclear ribosomal DNA network, and they clustered with samples of other North Island and northern South Island species in the chloroplast DNA network.

== Description ==
Myosotis forsteri plants are rosettes. The rosette leaves have long, narrow petioles that are about as long the leaf blades and easily distinguished from the leaf blades. The rosette leaves blades 15–40 mm long by 10–30 mm wide, broadly Both surfaces of the leaf are uniformly but sparsely covered in appressed straight antrorse (forward-facing) hairs. Each rosette has few to many ascending to erect, sometimes branched ebracteate inflorescences that are up to 300 mm long. The cauline leaves are similar to the rosette leaves, but are smaller, become smaller and sessile toward the top of the inflorescence, and are broadly ovate. The flowers are many per inflorescence, and each is borne on a short pedicel, without a bract. The calyx is 2.5–5 mm long at flowering and fruiting, lobed to one-half of its length or less, and with hairs mostly on the margins and ribs, some of which are hooked. The corolla is white, with a cylindrical tube, and small scales alternating with the petals. The anthers are included or partially exserted, with the tips only of the anthers surpassing the scales. The nutlets are c. 1.2 mm long.

The pollen of Myosotis forsteri is of the M. uniflora-type.

The chromosome number of M. forsteri is unknown.

Flowering October–April; fruiting November–May.

As to its breeding system, Myosotis forsteri is a self-compatible, apomictic or autonomously selfing plant.

== Distribution and habitat ==
Myosotis forsteri is a forget-me-not that is found in forest habitats, often near streams, seepages, or other damp, shaded places throughout the North Island and South Island of New Zealand.

== Conservation status ==
Myosotis forsteri is listed as Not Threatened on the most recent assessment (2017–2018) under the New Zealand Threatened Classification system for plants.

== Gallery ==
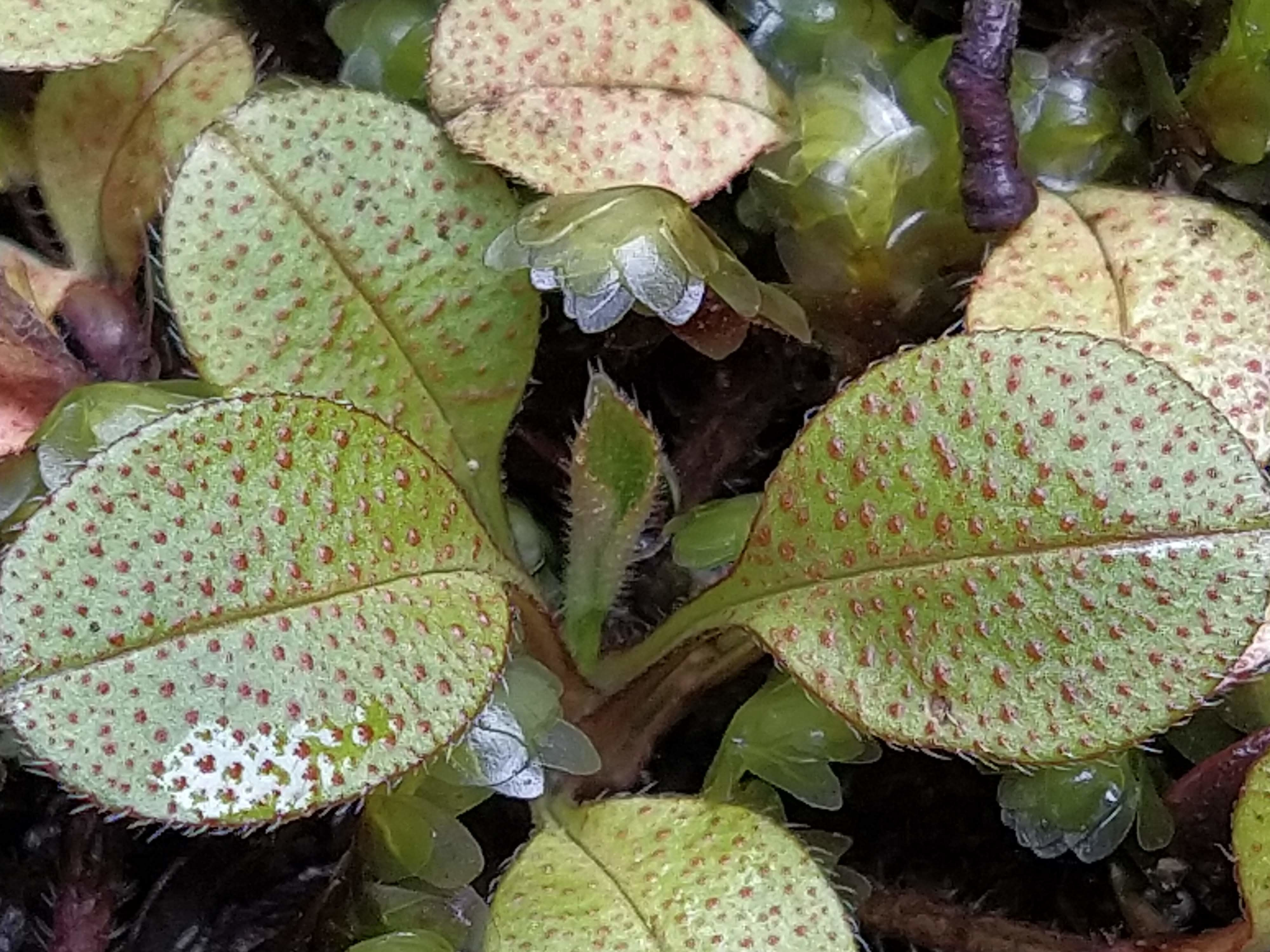
Close up of rosette leaves

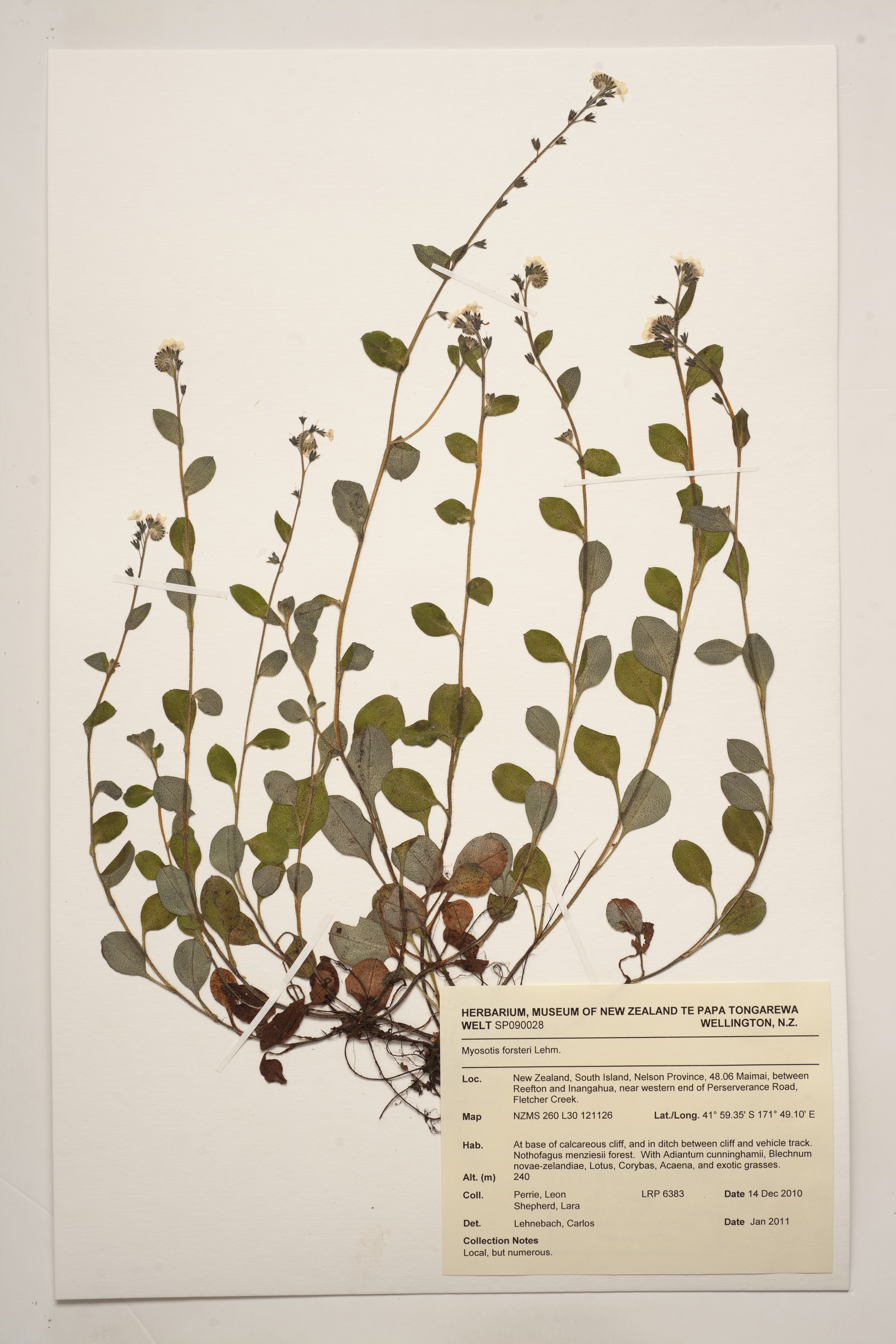
Habit

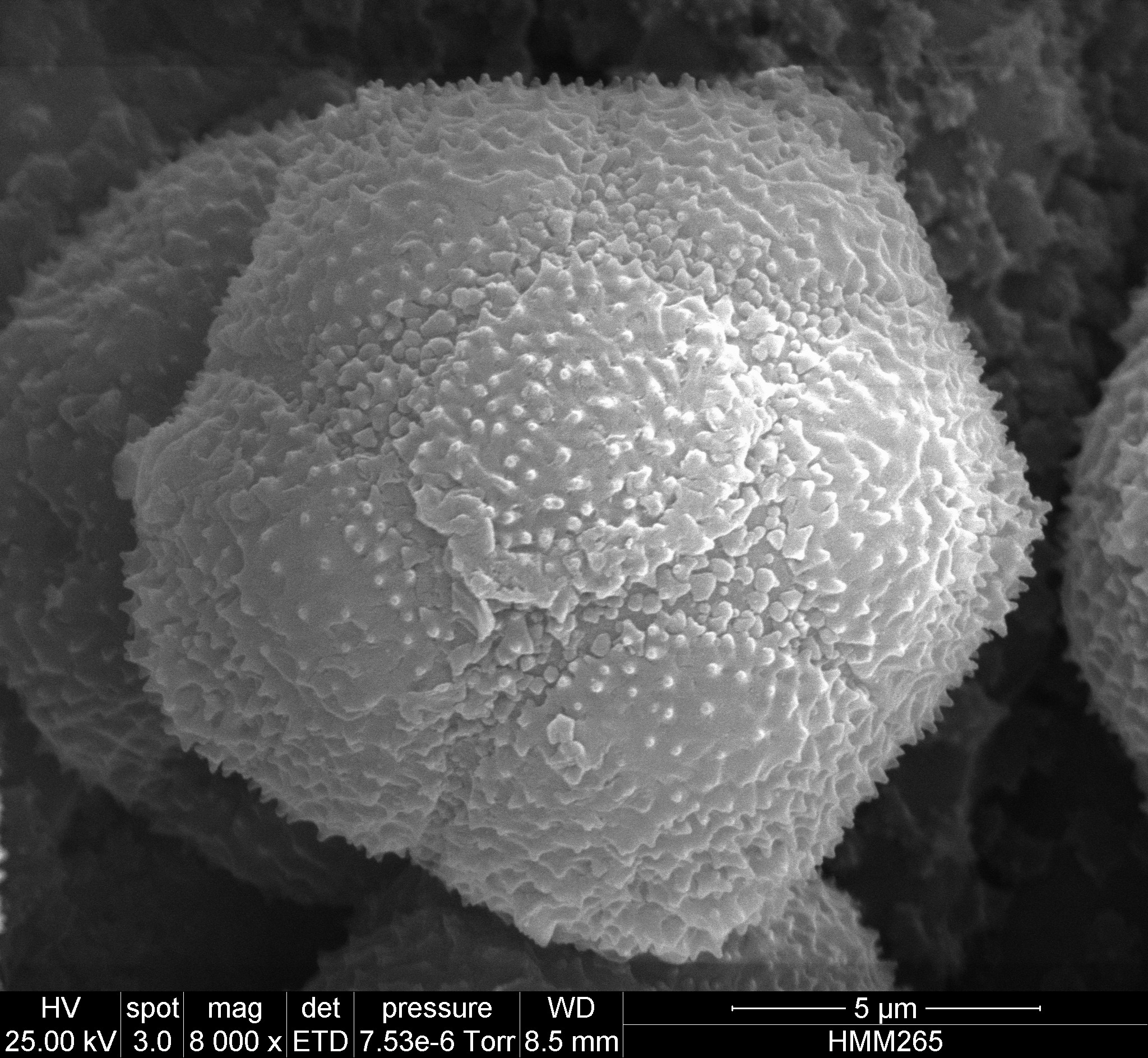
Pollen

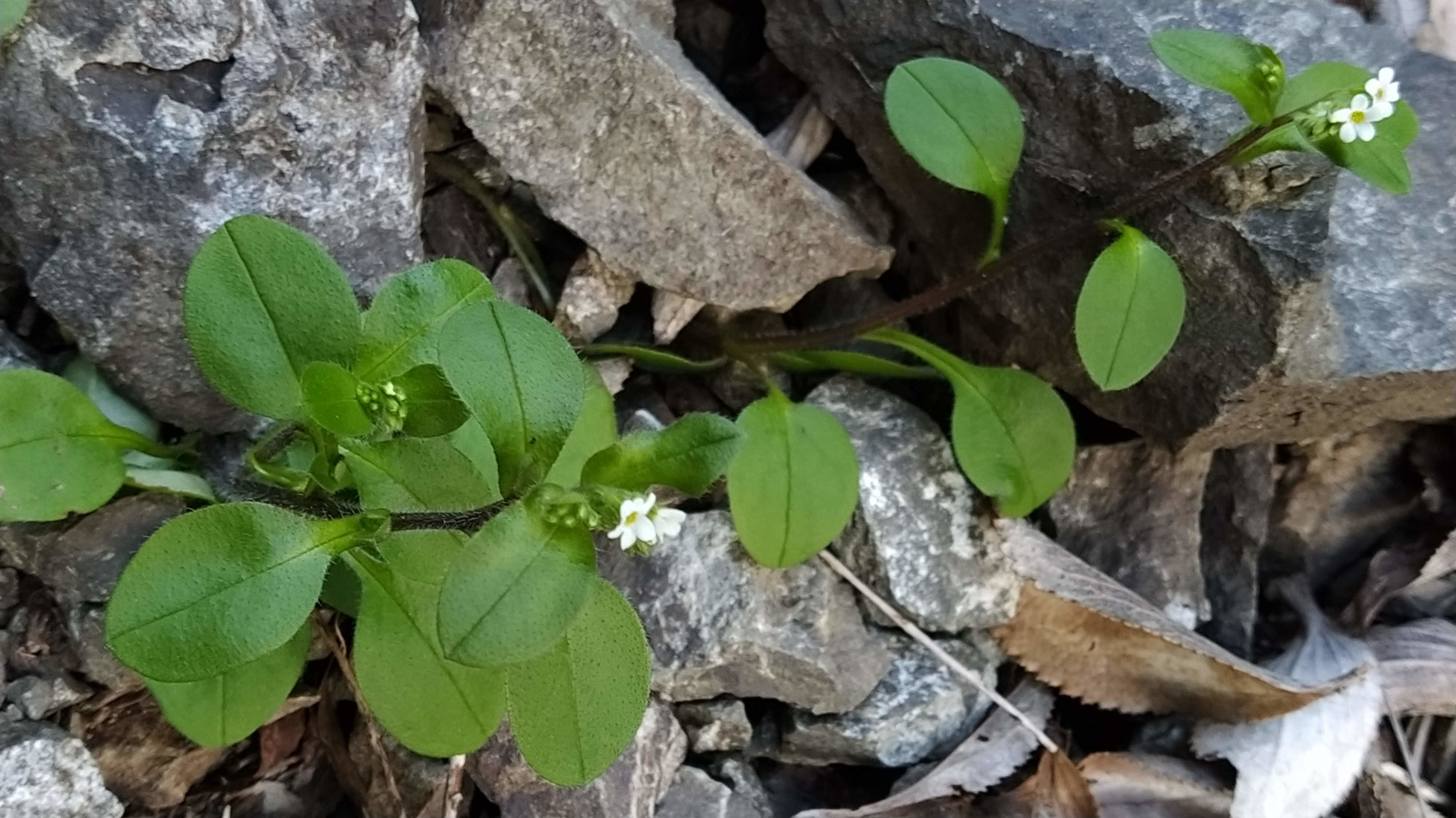
Habit

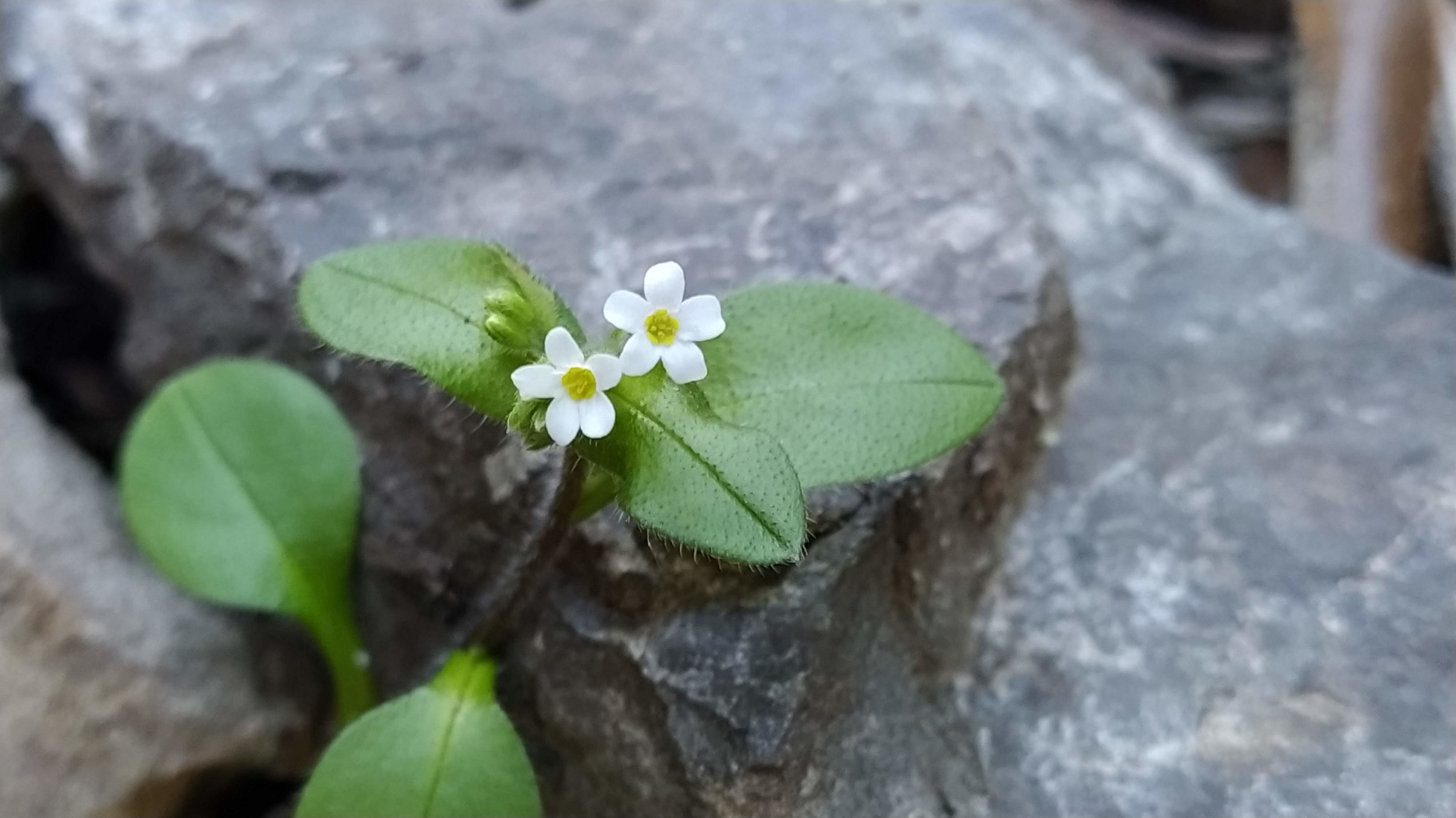
Flower detail
