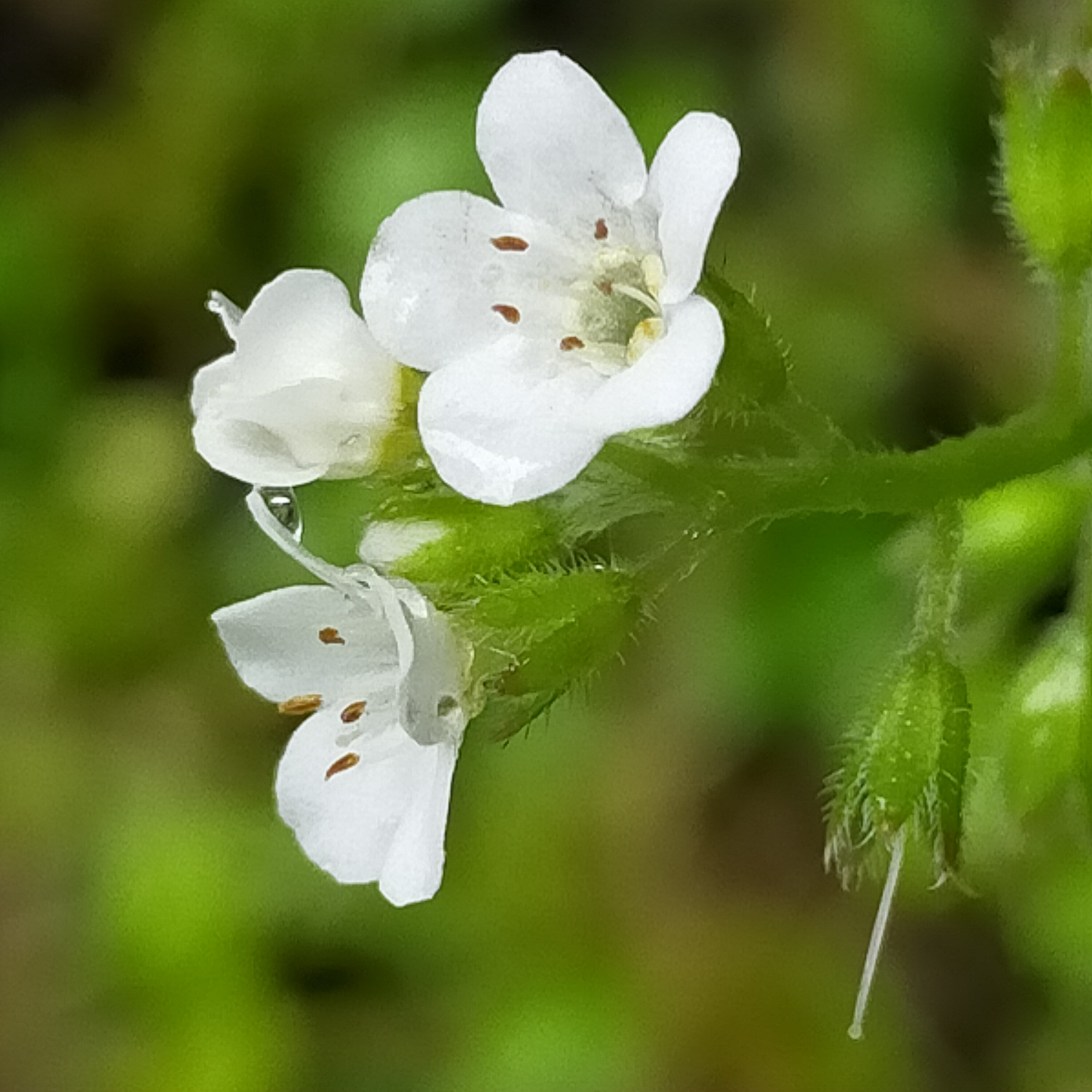
- flowers of Myosotis venosa showing exserted anthers

Conservation status
- Naturally Uncommon (NZ TCS)

Scientific classification
- Kingdom: Plantae
- Clade: Tracheophytes
- Clade: Angiosperms
- Clade: Eudicots
- Clade: Asterids
- Order: Boraginales
- Family: Boraginaceae
- Genus: Myosotis
- Species: M. venosa

Binomial name
- Myosotis venosa Colenso

= Myosotis venosa =

Species of flowering plant

Myosotis venosa is a species of flowering plant in the family Boraginaceae, endemic to New Zealand. William Colenso described the species in 1896. Plants of this species of forget-me-not are perennial rosettes with ebracteate inflorescences and white corollas with stamens that are fully exserted.

== Taxonomy and etymology ==
Myosotis venosa Colenso is in the plant family Boraginaceae. The species was originally described in 1896 by William Colenso. The most recent treatment of this species was done by Lucy B. Moore in the Flora of New Zealand.

The original description lists a specimen collected at the Ruahine Range by Edward Weston Andrews lodged at Kew Herbarium as the type.

Myosotis venosa is morphologically most similar to Myosotis forsteri in its habit and leaves. The two species can be distinguished based on anther exsertion: in M. forsteri the anthers are usually included inside the corolla tube, whereas in M. venosa the anthers are fully exserted. Whether these two species are distinct from one another requires taxonomic revision.

== Phylogeny ==
The sole sampled individual of M. venosa was shown to be included in the southern hemisphere lineage of Myosotis in phylogenetic analyses of standard DNA sequencing markers (nuclear ribosomal DNA and chloroplast DNA regions) of New Zealand Myosotis. Within the southern hemisphere lineage, species relationships were not well resolved.

Nevertheless, M. venosa clustered near the sampled individuals of M. forsteri in the nuclear ribosomal DNA network, and it clustered with samples of other North Island and northern South Island species in the chloroplast DNA network.

== Description ==
Myosotis venosa plants are rosettes. The rosette leaves have long, narrow petioles that are about as long the leaf blades and easily distinguished from the leaf blades. The rosette leaves are c. 70 mm long by c. 20 mm wide, and broadly oval, with an apiculate tip. The upper leaf surface has densely distributed, patent to erect hairs, whereas the hairs on the lower leaf surface are similar but sparsely distributed. Each rosette has few to many ascending to erect, sometimes branched ebracteate inflorescences that are 100–300 mm long. The cauline leaves are similar to the rosette leaves, but are smaller, and become smaller, narrower and sessile toward the top of the inflorescence. The flowers are many per inflorescence, and each is borne on a short pedicel, without a bract. The calyx is 4–6 mm long at flowering and fruiting, lobed to one-half of its length or less, and with hairs mostly on the margins and ribs, some of which are hooked near the base of the calyx. The corolla is white, with a cylindrical tube, and small scales alternating with the petals. The anthers are fully exserted, completely surpassing the scales. The nutlets are c. 1.5 mm long by 1.0 mm wide.

The pollen of Myosotis venosa is unknown.

The chromosome number of M. venosa is unknown.

Flowering December–February; fruiting December–April.

== Distribution and habitat ==
Myosotis venosa is a forget-me-not that is found in montane forest habitats, often near streams, in the Volcanic Plateau, Ruahine Range and Tararua Range in the North Island, and in Western Nelson, South Island of New Zealand.

== Conservation status ==
Myosotis venosa is listed as At Risk - Naturally Uncommon with the qualifiers Data Poor "DP" and Sparse "Sp" on the most recent assessment (2017–2018) under the New Zealand Threatened Classification system for plants.

== Gallery ==
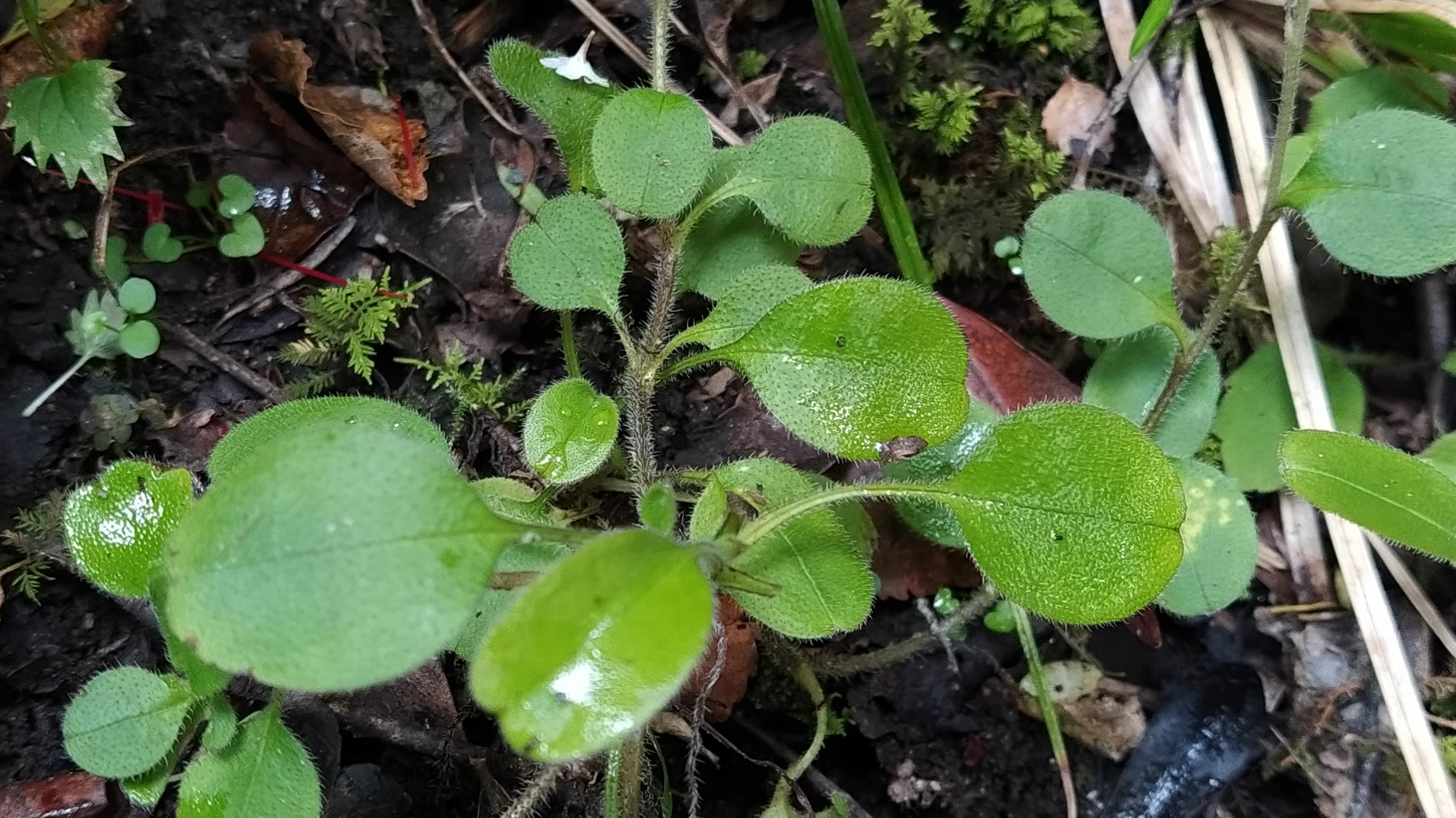

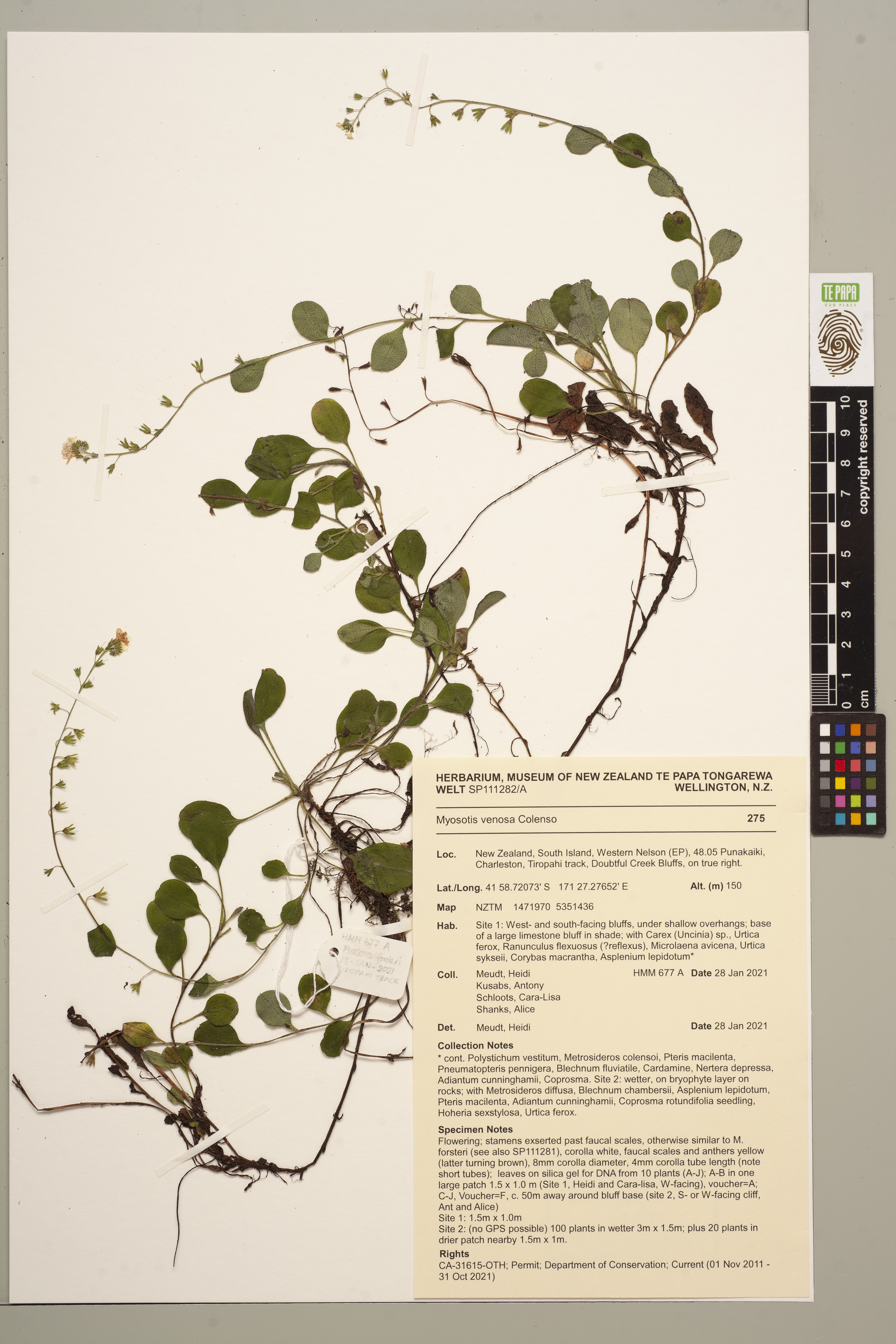

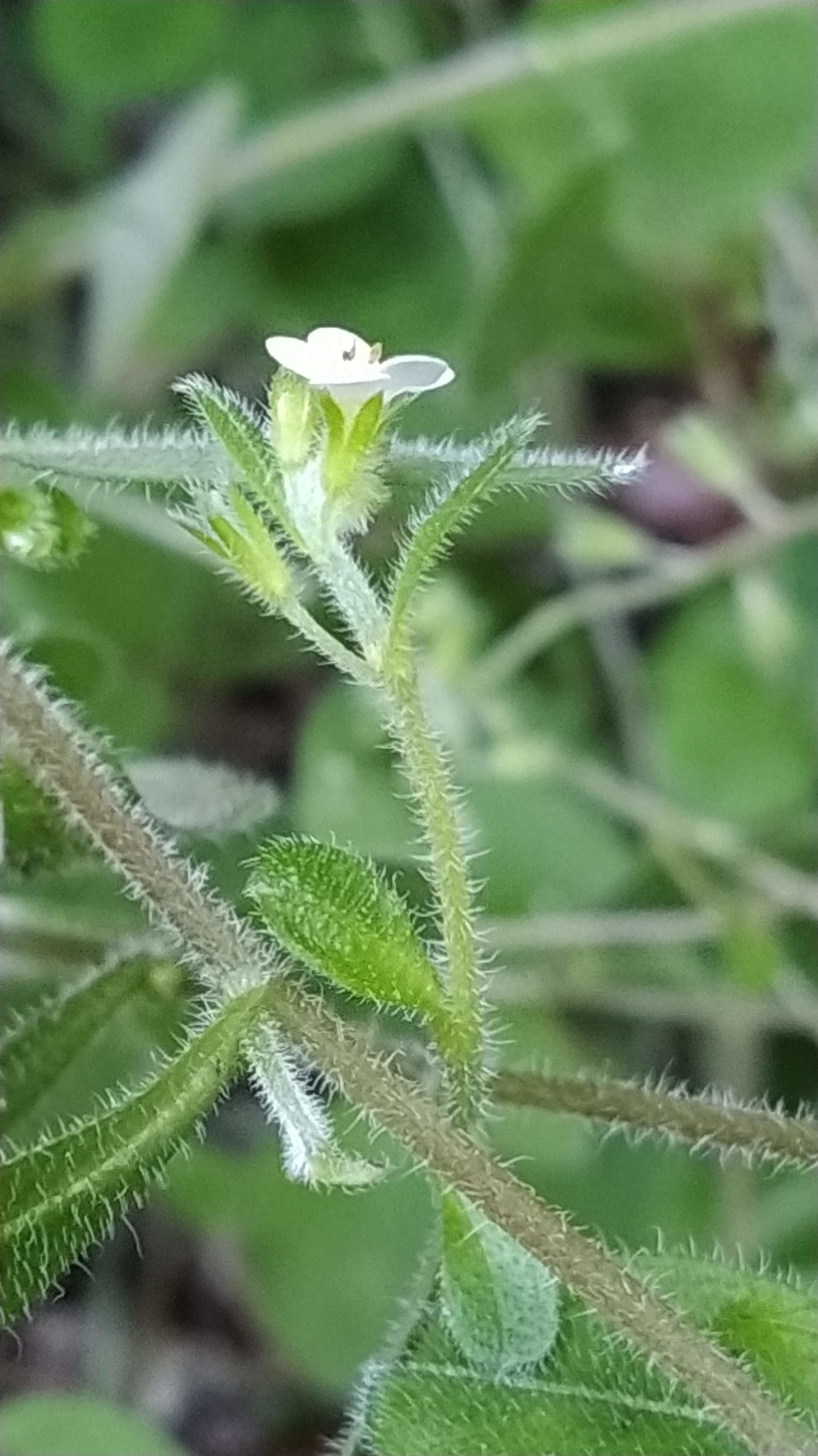

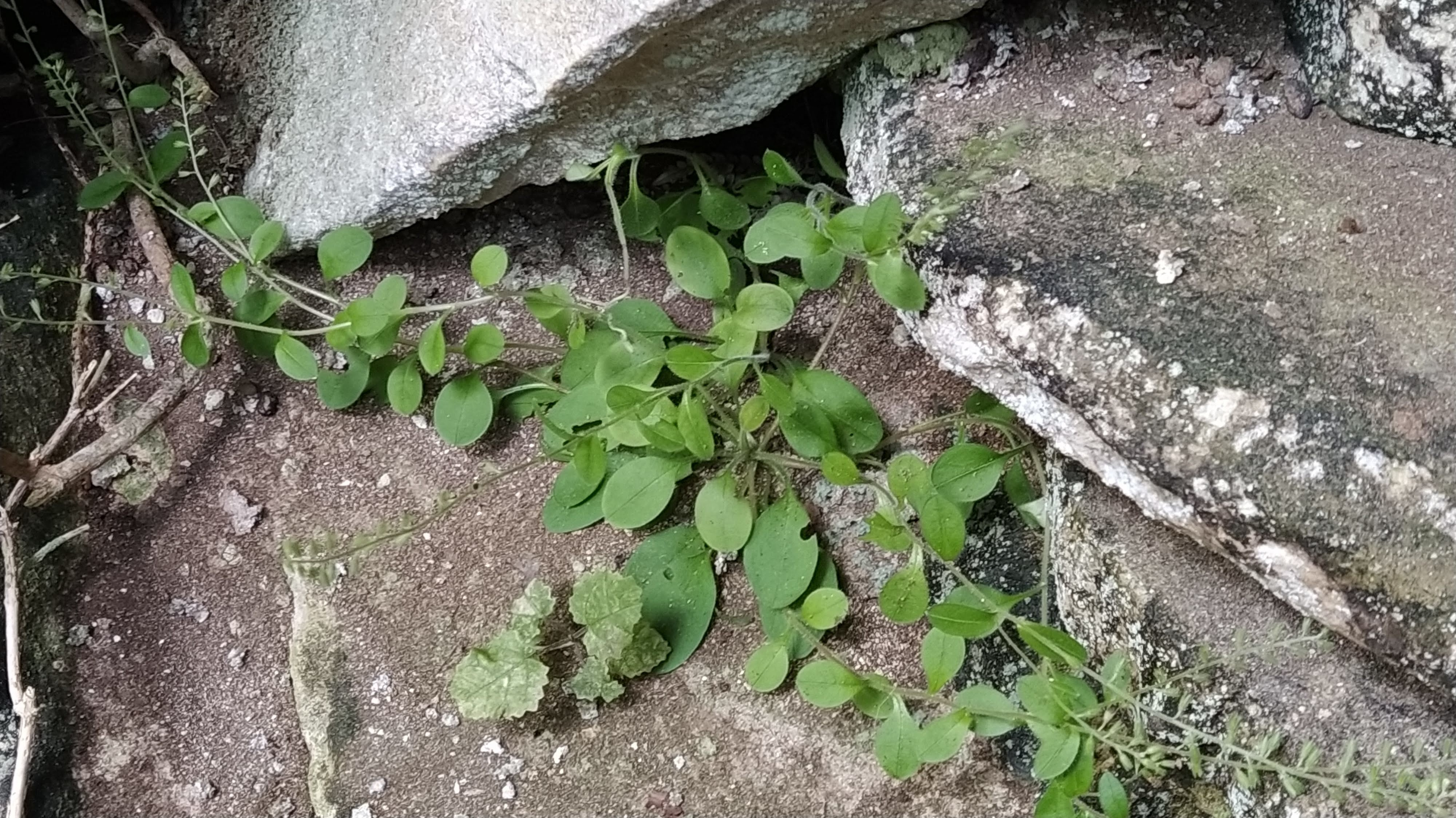
