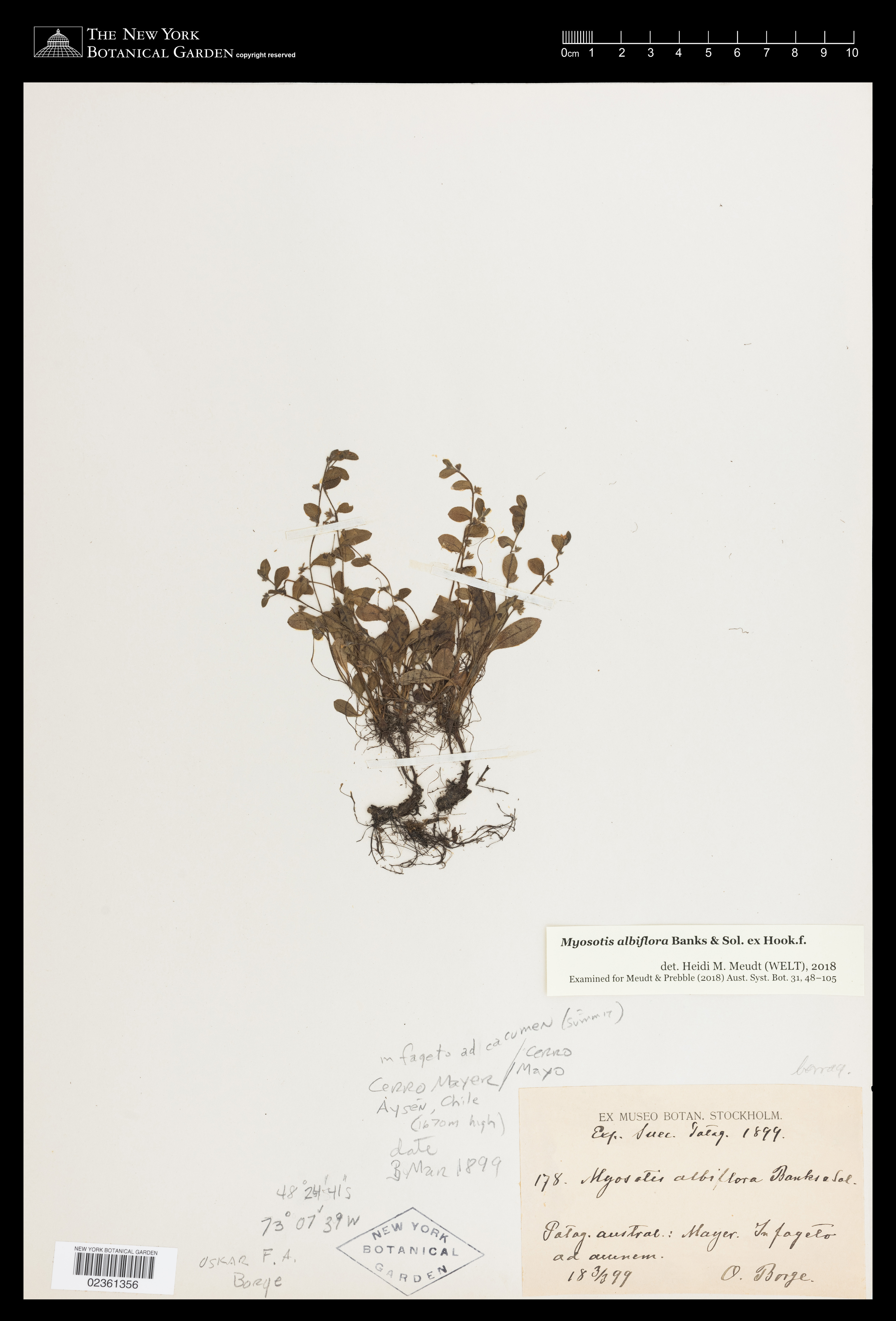
- Herbarium specimen of Myosotis albiflora

Scientific classification
- Kingdom: Plantae
- Clade: Tracheophytes
- Clade: Angiosperms
- Clade: Eudicots
- Clade: Asterids
- Order: Boraginales
- Family: Boraginaceae
- Genus: Myosotis
- Species: M. albiflora

Binomial name
- Myosotis albiflora Banks & Sol. ex Hook.f.

= Myosotis albiflora =

Species of flowering plant

Myosotis albiflora is a species of flowering plant in the family Boraginaceae, native to southern Chile and Argentina. This species was described by Joseph Banks and Daniel Solander in Joseph Dalton Hooker's 19th century work Flora Antarctica. Plants of this species of forget-me-not are perennial and have white corollas. It is one of two native species of Myosotis in southern South America, the other being M. antarctica.

== Description ==
Myosotis albiflora plants are single rosettes. The rosette leaves are 1 to 17 per plant and have petioles 6 to 30 mm long. The rosette leaf blades are 7 to 39 mm long by 3 to 12 mm wide (length: width ratio 1.8–3.6: 1), elliptic, oblanceolate or narrowly obovate, widest at or above the middle, with an obtuse apex. The upper surface of the leaf is densely covered in straight, appressed, antrorse (forward-facing) hairs that are oriented at an angle relative to the mid vein. The upper surface of the leaf is sparsely covered in straight, appressed, antrorse hairs that are oriented parallel to the mid vein. Each rosette has 4 to 15 creeping, sprawling, ascending or prostrate, unbranched or branched bracteate inflorescences that are 7 to 23 cm long. The cauline leaves are similar in shape and hairs to the rosette leaves, but are smaller, and becoming smaller and sessile toward the tip of the inflorescence. There can be up to 15 flowers in each inflorescence, each one borne on a short pedicel and with a cauline leaf (but the flower is often below the axil). The calyx is 2–3 mm long at flowering and 2 to 4 mm long at fruiting, lobed to more than half of its length, and densely covered in short, straight to flexuous, antrorse, appressed hairs. The corolla is white and up to 5 mm in diameter, with a cylindrical tube, petals that are usually broadly elliptic, ovate, or very broadly ovate and flat, and small scales alternating with the petals. The anthers are fully included inside the corolla tube, or sometimes partly exserted, with the tips only just reaching the scales. The four smooth, shiny, light to medium brown nutlets are 1.8 to 2.1 mm long by 1.2 to 1.4 mm wide and narrowly to broadly ovoid in shape.

M. albiflora has M. australis type pollen. The pollen of the three individuals sampled was nevertheless morphologically variable and considered to form a transition (Übergang) between pollen types.

The chromosome number of M. albiflora is unknown.

It flowers and fruits from December to March.

== Distribution and habitat ==
Myosotis albiflora is native to southern South America, including Chile (Aisén and Magallanes) and Argentina (Tierra del Fuego) from 0–50 m elevation. It is found in wet or moist sites in coastal areas on sand or rocks near beaches, streams, or waterfalls.

== Taxonomy and etymology ==
Myosotis albiflora Banks & Sol. ex Hook.f. is in the family Boraginaceae and was described in 1846 by Joseph Banks and Daniel Solander in Joseph Dalton Hooker's publication, Flora Antarctica. It is morphologically most similar to the New Zealand endemic bracteate-prostrate creeping species, M. tenericaulis, but can be distinguished from that species by its larger nutlets, styles that are usually shorter than the calyx at flowering, and longer stamens.

The type specimen of Myosotis albilfora was collected in Tierra del Fuego, Argentina, and is lodged at the Natural History Museum in London, England.

The specific epithet, albiflora, is derived from Latin (albus, white; floris, flower) and refers to its white corollas.

== Phylogeny ==
Myosotis albiflora was shown to be a part of the monophyletic southern hemisphere lineage of Myosotis in phylogenetic analyses of standard DNA sequencing markers (nuclear ribosomal DNA and chloroplast DNA regions). Within the southern hemisphere lineage, species relationships were not well resolved.

The species was not included in a 2025 phylogenomic study based on DNA from whole plastids, target capture of universal angiosperm bait markers, and the full nuclear ribosomal DNA cistron.

== Conservation status ==
Myosotis albiflora is not listed on the IUCN Red List. Few collections and little information about population sizes is available, and some herbarium specimen labels list it as being escasa (rare) or esparcidamente (sparse) where collected.
