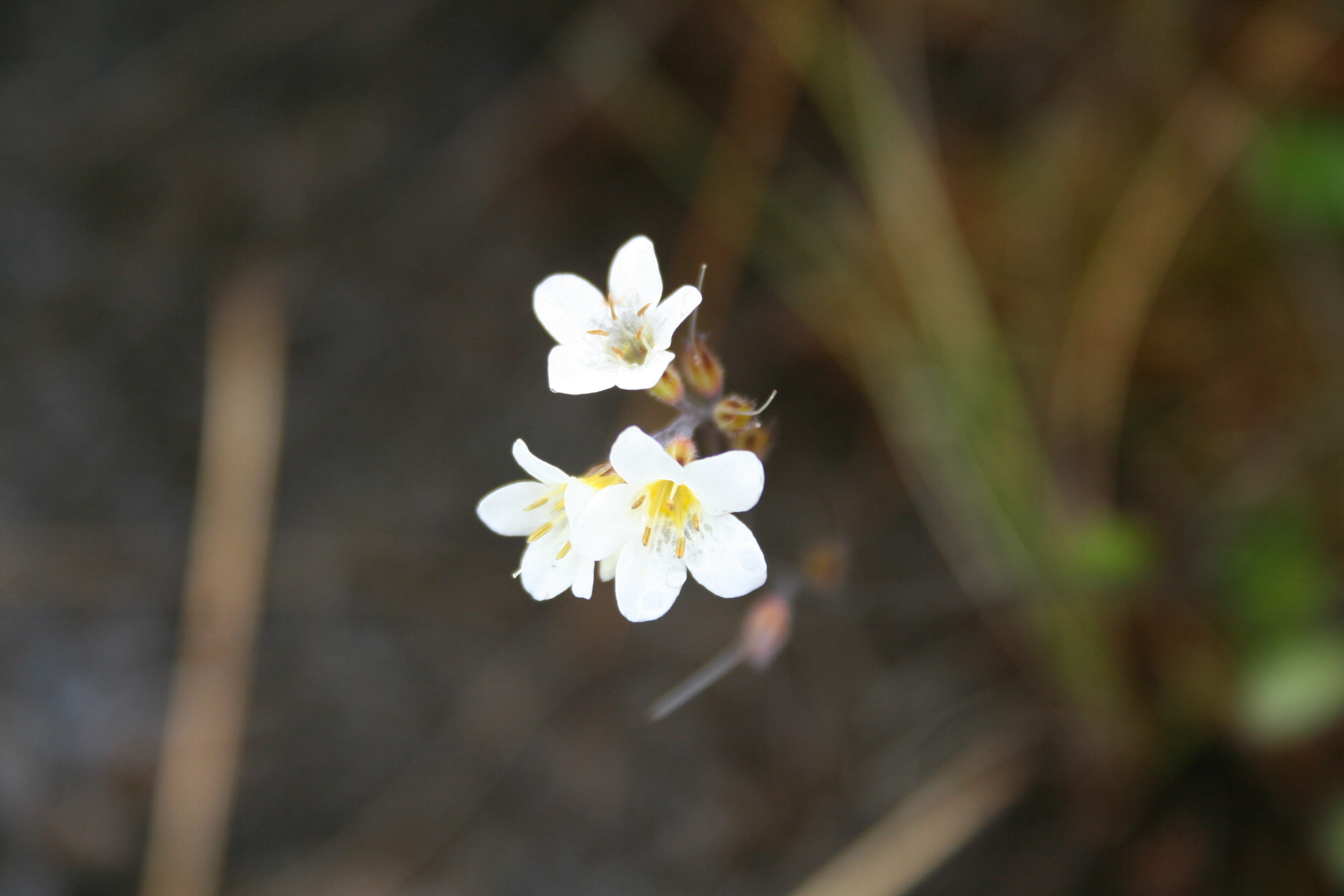

Conservation status
- Nationally Endangered (NZ TCS)

Scientific classification
- Kingdom: Plantae
- Clade: Tracheophytes
- Clade: Angiosperms
- Clade: Eudicots
- Clade: Asterids
- Order: Boraginales
- Family: Boraginaceae
- Genus: Myosotis
- Species: M. laeta

Binomial name
- Myosotis laeta Cheeseman, 1885

= Myosotis laeta =

Species of flowering plant

Myosotis laeta is a species of flowering plant in the family Boraginaceae, endemic to ultramafic areas of the Sounds-Nelson area of the South Island of New Zealand. Thomas Cheeseman described the species in 1885. Plants of this species of forget-me-not are perennial rosettes which form loose tufts or clumps, with ebracteate, erect inflorescences, and white corollas.

== Taxonomy and etymology ==
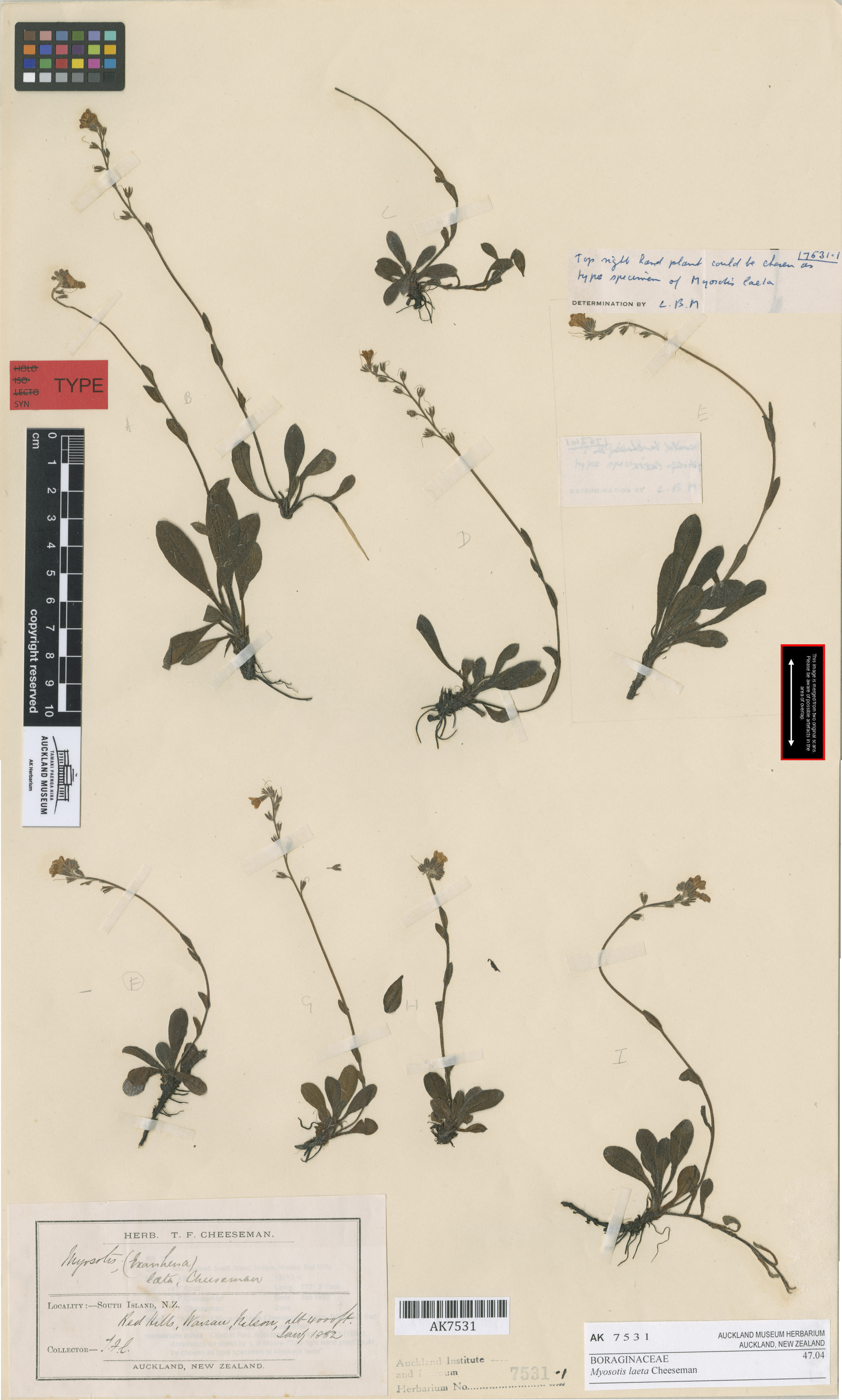
Specimen of Myosotis laeta collected by Thomas Cheeseman

Myosotis laeta is in the plant family Boraginaceae and was described in 1885 by Thomas Cheeseman.

Myosotis laeta is morphologically similar to other ebracteate-erect species, especially M. brockiei, M. capitata and M. rakiura. It is probably most similar to M. brockiei from Western Nelson, South Island, New Zealand. M. laeta is also sometimes confused with M. monroi, whose geographic range overlaps with that of M. laeta in ultramafic areas of Sounds-Nelson, South Island.

Myosotis laeta can be distinguished from M. brockiei by the following characters: the underside of the rosette leaves are much less hairy and are all retrorse (backward-facing), the hairs on the leaf edges are patent instead of erect, the calyx has hooked hairs, and the flower has short filaments. Some of these characters also help distinguish M. laeta from M. rakiura and M. capitata, both of which are found much further south in southern South Island and Rakiura / Stewart Island, and the New Zealand subantarctic islands, respectively.

Myosotis laeta can be distinguished from M. monroi by its patent, oblique, flexuous hairs on the leaf that are retrorse on the underside, its unbranched inflorescences, the retrorse hairs on the smaller calyx, and its calyx lobes that are more than half the length of the calyx.

The lectotype specimen of Myosotis laeta was collected by Thomas Cheeseman from Red Hills, Wairau in 1882 and is lodged at the Auckland War Memorial Museum Herbarium (AK 7531). There is also an isolectotype there (AK 210594) and another at the Museum of New Zealand Te Papa Tongarewa (WELT SP002415).

The specific epithet, laeta, is derived from the Latin laetus and means bright, cheerful or pleasant.

== Phylogeny ==
Myosotis laeta has not yet been included in any phylogenetic analyses of southern hemisphere Myosotis using standard DNA sequencing markers (nuclear ribosomal DNA and chloroplast DNA regions).

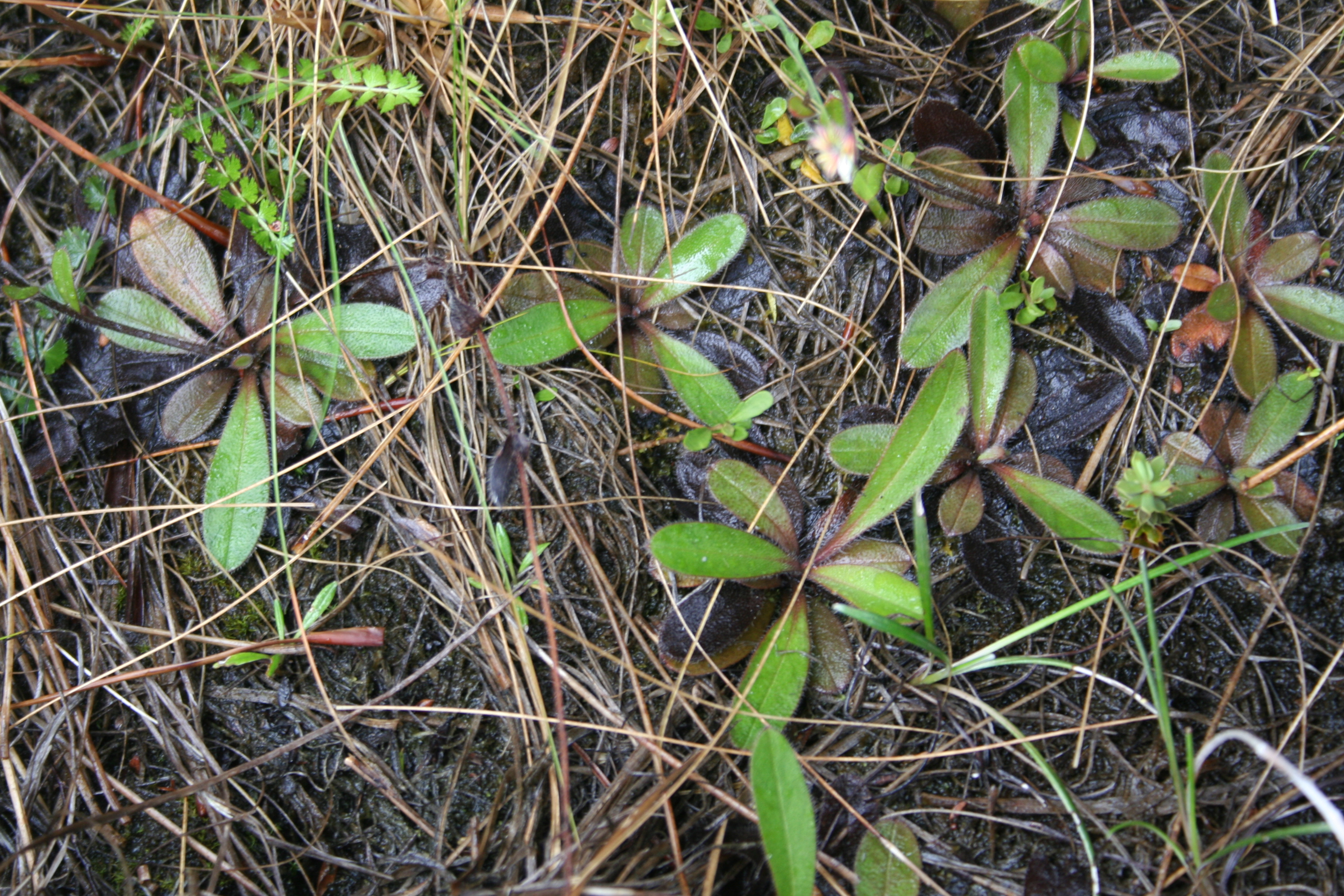
Rosettes

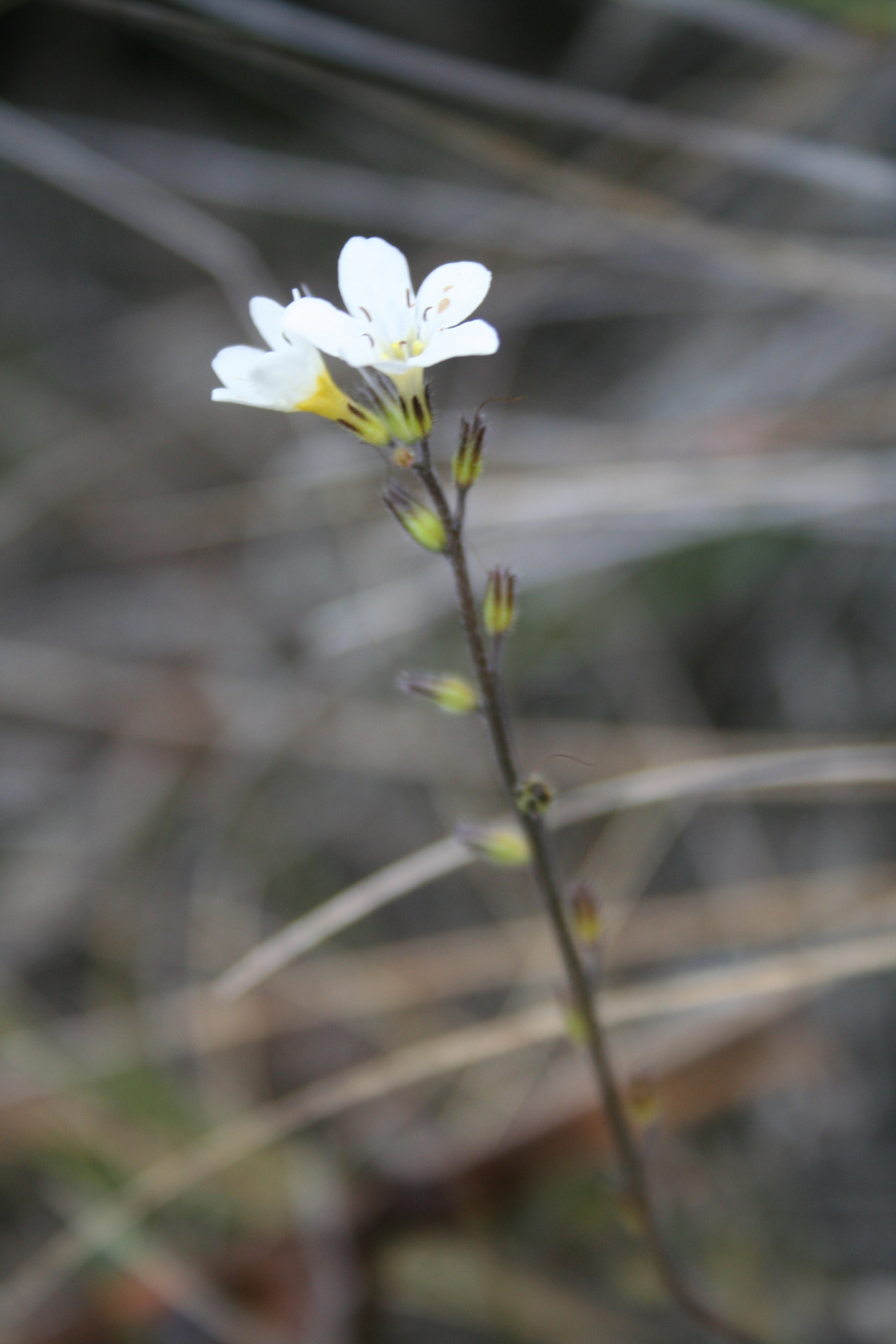
Inflorescence

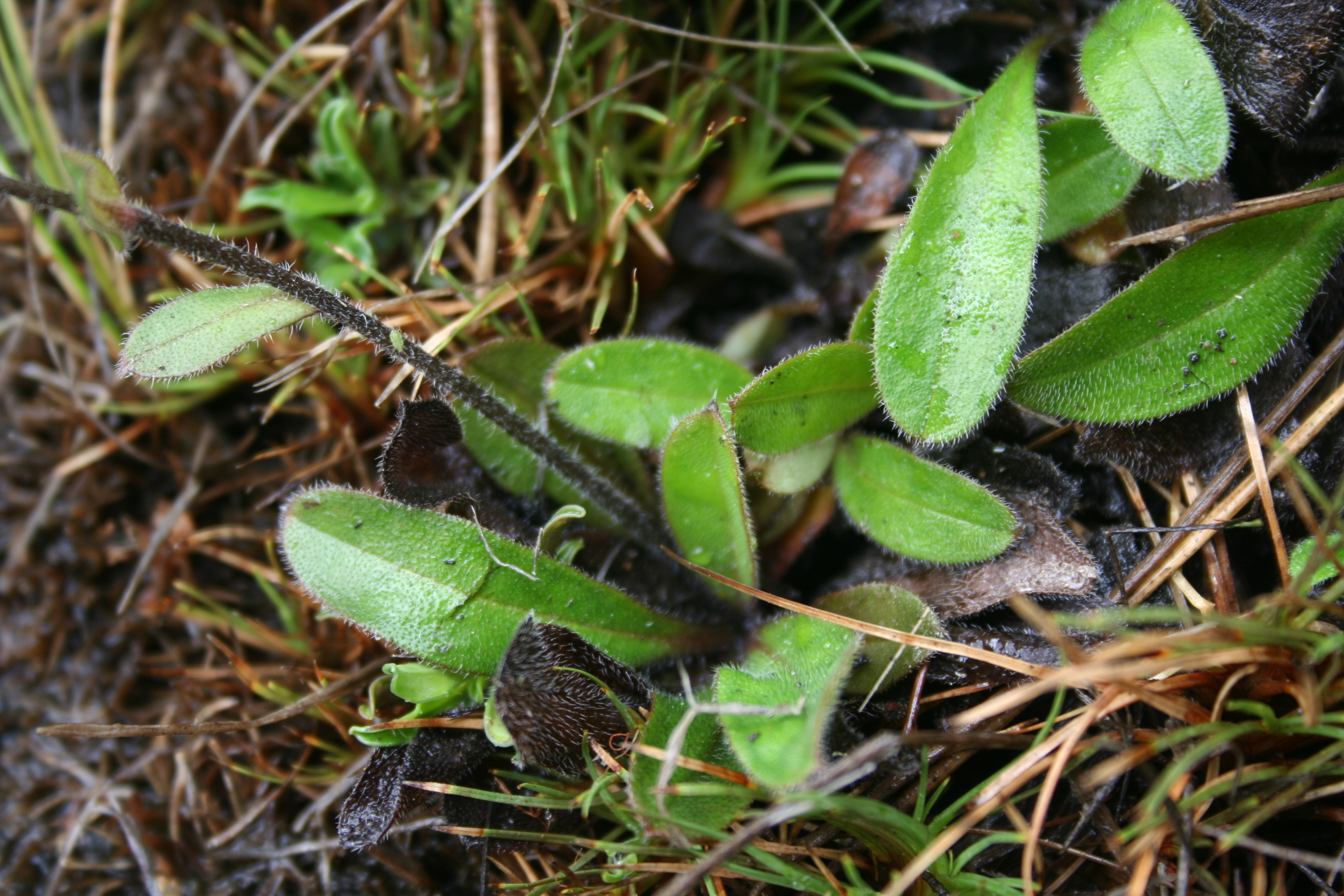
Leaves

== Description ==
Myosotis laeta plants are single rosettes that often grow together to form loose tufts or clumps. The rosette leaves have petioles 4–29 mm long. The rosette leaf blades are 8–35 mm long by 4–10 mm wide (length: width ratio 1.5–4.0: 1), narrowly obovate or oblanceolate, widest at or above the middle, with an obtuse apex. The upper surface and the edges of the leaf are densely covered in mostly flexuous, patent to erect, antrorse (forward-facing) hairs that are usually oriented oblique to the mid vein. The hairs on the underside of the leaf are similar but mostly retrorse (backward-facing), oriented parallel or oblique to the mid vein, and less hairy (sparsely to densely distributed). Each rosette has 1–2 erect, unbranched, ebracteate inflorescences that are up to 220 mm long. The cauline leaves are similar to the rosette leaves but smaller with shorter petioles, and decrease in size toward the tip. Each inflorescence has up to 15 flowers, each borne on a pedicel up to 4 mm long at fruiting, and each without a bract. The calyx is 3–5 mm long at flowering or fruiting, lobed to half to nearly its full length, and densely covered in mostly antrorse (some retrorse near the base), appressed to patent hairs, that can be straight, flexuous, curved, or hooked. The corolla is white, up to 11 mm in diameter, with a cylindrical tube, petals that are broadly ovate or broadly obovate, and small yellow scales alternating with the petals. The anthers are fully exserted above the scales. The four smooth, shiny, light brown nutlets are 1.4–2.1 mm long by 0.6–1.2 mm wide and narrowly ovoid in shape.

The chromosome number of M. laeta is unknown.

The pollen of M. laeta is unknown.

It flowers and fruits from November–January, with the main flowering and fruiting period in January.

== Distribution and habitat ==
Myosotis laeta is a forget-me-not endemic to the Richmond Range, Sounds-Nelson, northern South Island of New Zealand from 850–1200 m ASL. It is found in damp ultramafic grassland, shrubland or fellfield in the mineral belt.

== Conservation status ==
The species is listed as Threatened - Nationally Endangered on the most recent assessment (2017-2018) under the New Zealand Threatened Classification system for plants, with the qualifiers "DP" (Data Poor), "RR" (Range Restricted), "RF" Recruitment Failure, and "St" (Stable).
