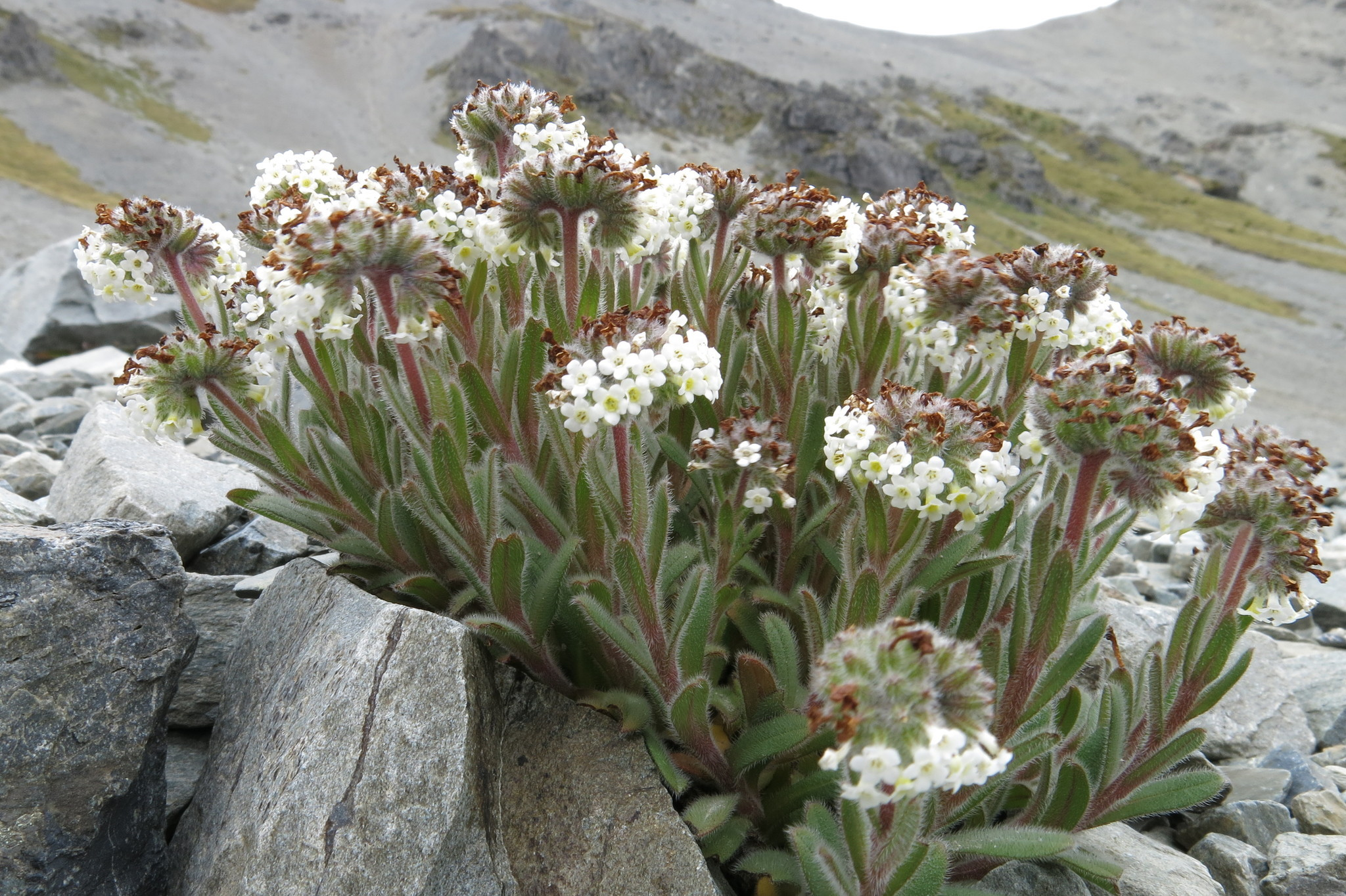
- Flowering plant of Myosotis traversii subsp. cantabrica

Conservation status
- Not Threatened (NZ TCS)

Scientific classification
- Kingdom: Plantae
- Clade: Tracheophytes
- Clade: Angiosperms
- Clade: Eudicots
- Clade: Asterids
- Order: Boraginales
- Family: Boraginaceae
- Genus: Myosotis
- Species: M. traversii
- Subspecies: M. t. subsp. cantabrica

Trinomial name
- Myosotis traversii subsp. cantabrica (L.B.Moore) Meudt

Synonyms
- Myosotis traversii var. cantabrica

= Myosotis traversii subsp. cantabrica =

Species of flowering plant

Myosotis traversii subsp. cantabrica is a subspecies of flowering plant in the family Boraginaceae, endemic to the central South Island of New Zealand. Lucy Moore described M. traversii var. cantabrica in 1961 and Heidi Meudt changed its rank to subspecies in 2021. Plants of this subspecies of forget-me-not are perennial rosettes which form tufts or clumps, with ebracteate, erect inflorescences, and white or yellow corollas with partly exserted stamens.

== Taxonomy and etymology ==
Myosotis traversii subsp. cantabrica (L.B.Moore) Meudt is in the plant family Boraginaceae. The species M. traversii was described by Joseph Dalton Hooker in 1864 in his Handbook of the New Zealand Flora. Lucy Moore described the variety M. traversii var. cantabrica in 1961 and Heidi Meudt changed its rank to subspecies in 2021.

The holotype of M. traversii var. cantabrica was collected at Lake Ohau, South Island, and is lodged at the herbarium of the Museum of New Zealand Te Papa Tongarewa (WELT SP004827/A). There are additional isotypes at the same institution (WELT SP004827/B-D).

The epithet, cantabrica, is a reference to Canterbury, one of the regions in the South Island of New Zealand where this subspecies is found.

This is one of two subspecies recognized in Myosotis traversii; the other is M. traversii subsp. traversii. The subspecies are allopatric, with M. traversii subsp. cantabrica found in central South Island in Canterbury, Westland and Otago (from about 43°S to 45°S), and M. traversii subsp. traversii found in northern South Island in Western Nelson, Marlborough, Canterbury and Westland (from about 41°S to 42.5°S).

Myosotis traversii subsp. cantabrica plants have hooked hairs on the underside of the uppermost cauline leaves, and the also have retrorse (backward-facing) hairs on the underside of the lowermost cauline leaves. By contrast, M. traversii subsp. traversii can be distinguished from M. traversii subsp. cantabrica by its lack of hooked hairs on the underside of the uppermost cauline leaves, and lack of retrorse (backward-facing) hairs on the underside of the lowermost cauline leaves.

== Phylogeny ==
The sole individual of Myosotis traversii sampled for phylogenetic analysis was an individual of M. traversii subsp. cantabrica, and was shown to be a part of the monophyletic southern hemisphere lineage of Myosotis in phylogenetic analyses of standard DNA sequencing markers (nuclear ribosomal DNA and chloroplast DNA regions). Within the southern hemisphere lineage, species relationships were not well resolved.

== Description ==
Myosotis traversii subsp. cantabrica plants are single rosettes that often grow together to form clumps or tufts. The rosette leaves have petioles 4–29 mm long. The rosette leaf blades are 5–33 mm long by 3–12 mm wide (length: width ratio 1.5–4.5: 1), usually oblanceolate, narrowly obovate, or obovate, widest at or above the middle, with an obtuse apex. The upper surface and the edges of the leaf are densely covered in mostly flexuous and patent, antrorse (forward-facing) hairs that are oriented mostly oblique to the mid vein. The lower surface of the leaf has similar hairs except they are completely retrorse (backward-facing) or they are mostly retrorse with some antrorse hairs near the apex only. Each rosette has 3–14 erect, usually once-branched ebracteate inflorescences that are up to 200 mm long and are usually bifurcating in an open or condensed forked 'V' shape near the tips. The scape has mostly flexuous or curved hairs (sometimes hooked near the flowering part of the inflorescence) that are also mostly antrorse but sometimes retrorse near the base. The cauline leaves are up to 18 per inflorescence and are similar to the rosette leaves but smaller with shorter petioles, and decrease in size and become sessile toward the tip. The underside of the uppermost cauline leaves have hooked hairs. Each inflorescence has up to 75 flowers, each borne on a pedicel up to 2 mm long at fruiting, and each without a bract. The hairs on the pedicel are flexuous, rarely mixed with hooked or curved hairs, antrorse, patent or erect, and densely distributed. The calyx is 3–7 mm long at flowering and 4–9 mm long at fruiting, lobed to one-third to one-half its length, and densely covered in antrorse hairs (with some retrorse near the base) that are appressed to patent and flexuous, or patent to erect and hooked. The corolla is white or yellow, up to 6 mm in diameter, with a cylindrical tube, petals that are broadly ovate, very broadly ovate., broadly obovate, broadly obovate or very broadly obovate, and small yellow or light yellow scales alternating with the petals. The stamens are 4–8 mm long (measured from the base of the calyx to the anther tips) with filaments 0.1–0.3 mm long. The anthers are partly exserted with the tips only surpassing or equaling the scales. The four smooth, shiny, medium to dark brown nutlets are 1.5–2.4 mm long by 0.9–1.4 mm wide and narrowly ovoid or ovoid in shape.

The chromosome number of M. traversii subsp. cantabrica is unknown.

The pollen of M. traversii subsp. cantabrica is unknown.

It flowers and fruits from November–February, with the main flowering and fruiting period from January–February.

== Distribution and habitat ==
Myosotis traversii subsp. cantabrica is a forget-me-not endemic to the South Island, in Canterbury, Westland and Otago from 690–2280 m ASL, on rocks, shingle, scree, bare, dry, exposed, stony sites in fellfield.

== Conservation status ==
Myosotis traversii subsp. cantabrica is listed as Not Threatened (as M. traversii) on the most recent assessment (2017-2018) under the New Zealand Threatened Classification system for plants, with the qualifier "DP" (Data Poor). in the most recent assessment (2017-2018) under the New Zealand Threatened Classification system for plants.
