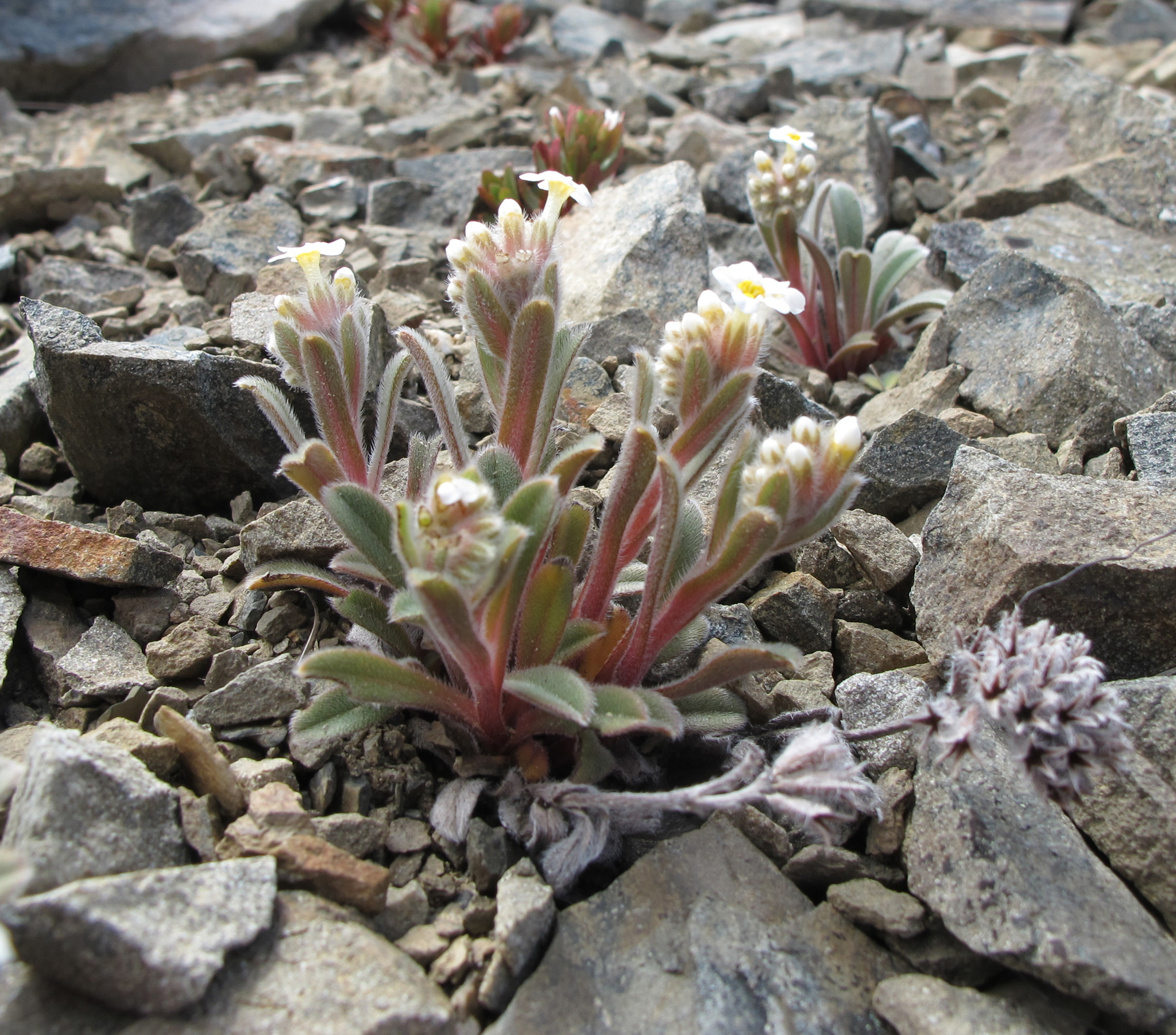
- Flowering plant of Myosotis traversii subsp. traversii

Conservation status
- Not Threatened (NZ TCS)

Scientific classification
- Kingdom: Plantae
- Clade: Tracheophytes
- Clade: Angiosperms
- Clade: Eudicots
- Clade: Asterids
- Order: Boraginales
- Family: Boraginaceae
- Genus: Myosotis
- Species: M. traversii
- Subspecies: M. t. subsp. traversii

Trinomial name
- Myosotis traversii subsp. traversii Hook.f.

Synonyms
- Myosotis traversii var. traversii

= Myosotis traversii subsp. traversii =

Species of flowering plant

Myosotis traversii subsp. traversii is a subspecies of flowering plant in the family Boraginaceae, endemic to the northern South Island of New Zealand. Joseph Dalton Hooker described the species M. traversii in 1864. Plants of this subspecies of forget-me-not are perennial rosettes which form tufts or clumps, with ebracteate, erect inflorescences, and white or yellow corollas with partly exserted stamens.

== Taxonomy and etymology ==
Myosotis traversii Hook.f. subsp. traversii is in the plant family Boraginaceae. The species M. traversii was described by Joseph Dalton Hooker in 1864 in his Handbook of the New Zealand Flora.

The lectotype of M. traversii was designated by Lucy Moore, was collected by Leonard Cockayne in the Shingly Range, South Island, and is lodged at the herbarium of the Museum of New Zealand Te Papa Tongarewa (WELT SP002603). There is also an isolectotype at the Allan Herbarium of Manaaki Whenua - Landcare Research (CHR 328277).

The specific epithet, traversii, honors William Thomas Locke Travers (1819–1903), who was a lawyer, explorer and naturalist who immigrated to New Zealand and collected plants there.

This is one of two subspecies recognized in Myosotis traversii; the other is M. traversii subsp. cantabrica. The subspecies are allopatric, with M. traversii subsp. cantabrica found in central South Island in Canterbury, Westland and Otago (from about 43°S to 45°S), and M. traversii subsp. traversii found in northern South Island in Western Nelson, Marlborough, Canterbury and Westland (from about 41°S to 42.5°S).

Myosotis traversii subsp. traversii can be distinguished from M. traversii subsp. cantabrica by its lack of hooked hairs on the underside of the uppermost cauline leaves, and lack of retrorse (backward-facing) hairs on the underside of the lowermost cauline leaves. By contrast, M. traversii subsp. cantabrica plants have hooked hairs on the underside of the uppermost cauline leaves, and the also have retrorse (backward-facing) hairs on the underside of the lowermost cauline leaves.

== Phylogeny ==
The sole individual of Myosotis traversii sampled for phylogenetic analysis was an individual of M. traversii subsp. cantabrica, and was shown to be a part of the monophyletic southern hemisphere lineage of Myosotis in phylogenetic analyses of standard DNA sequencing markers (nuclear ribosomal DNA and chloroplast DNA regions). Within the southern hemisphere lineage, species relationships were not well resolved. M. traversii subsp. traversii has not yet been included in a phylogenetic analysis.

== Description ==
Myosotis traversii subsp. traversii plants are single rosettes often cluster together to form clumps or tufts. The rosette leaves have petioles 4–29 mm long. The rosette leaf blades are 5–33 mm long by 3–12 mm wide (length: width ratio 1.5–4.5: 1), usually oblanceolate, narrowly obovate, or obovate, widest at or above the middle, with an obtuse apex. The upper surface and the edges of the leaf are densely covered in mostly flexuous and patent, antrorse (forward-facing) hairs that are oriented mostly oblique to the mid vein. The lower surface of the leaf has similar hairs except they are completely retrorse (backward-facing) or they are mostly retrorse with some antrorse hairs near the apex only. Each rosette has 1–7 erect, usually once-branched ebracteate inflorescences that are up to 160 mm long and are usually bifurcating in an open or condensed forked 'V' shape near the tips. The scape has mostly flexuous (few curved), antrorse, appressed to patent, densely distributed hairs. The cauline leaves are up to 13 per inflorescence and are similar to the rosette leaves but smaller with shorter petioles, and decrease in size and become sessile toward the tip. The underside of the cauline leaves have hairs that are not hooked and are mostly antrorse. Each inflorescence has up to 50 flowers, each borne on a pedicel up to 2 mm long at fruiting, and each without a bract. The hairs on the pedicel are flexuous, antrorse, patent and densely distributed. The calyx is 3–7 mm long at flowering and 4–9 mm long at fruiting, lobed to one-third to one-half its length, and densely covered in antrorse hairs (with some retrorse near the base) that are appressed to patent and flexuous, or patent to erect and hooked. The corolla is white or yellow, up to 8 mm in diameter, with a cylindrical tube, petals that are broadly ovate, very broadly ovate., broadly obovate, broadly obovate or very broadly obovate, and small yellow or light yellow scales alternating with the petals. The stamens are 7–10 mm long (measured from the base of the calyx to the anther tips) with filaments 0.3–0.8 mm long. The anthers are partly exserted with the tips only surpassing or equaling the scales. The four smooth, shiny, medium to dark brown nutlets are 2.1–2.7 mm long by 1.2–1.8 mm wide and narrowly ovoid or ovoid in shape.

The chromosome number of M. traversii subsp. traversii is 2n = 44 (CHR 100421).

The pollen of M. traversii subsp. traversii is unknown.

It flowers and fruits from November–March, with the main flowering and fruiting period from December–January.

== Distribution and habitat ==
Myosotis traversii subsp. traversii is a forget-me-not endemic to the South Island, in Marlborough, Western Nelson, Canterbury and Westland usually from 1100–2040 m ASL, on scree, shingle, rocks, or saddles.

== Conservation status ==
Myosotis traversii subsp. traversii is listed as Not Threatened (as M. traversii) on the most recent assessment (2017-2018) under the New Zealand Threatened Classification system for plants, with the qualifier "DP" (Data Poor). in the most recent assessment (2017-2018) under the New Zealand Threatened Classification system for plants.
