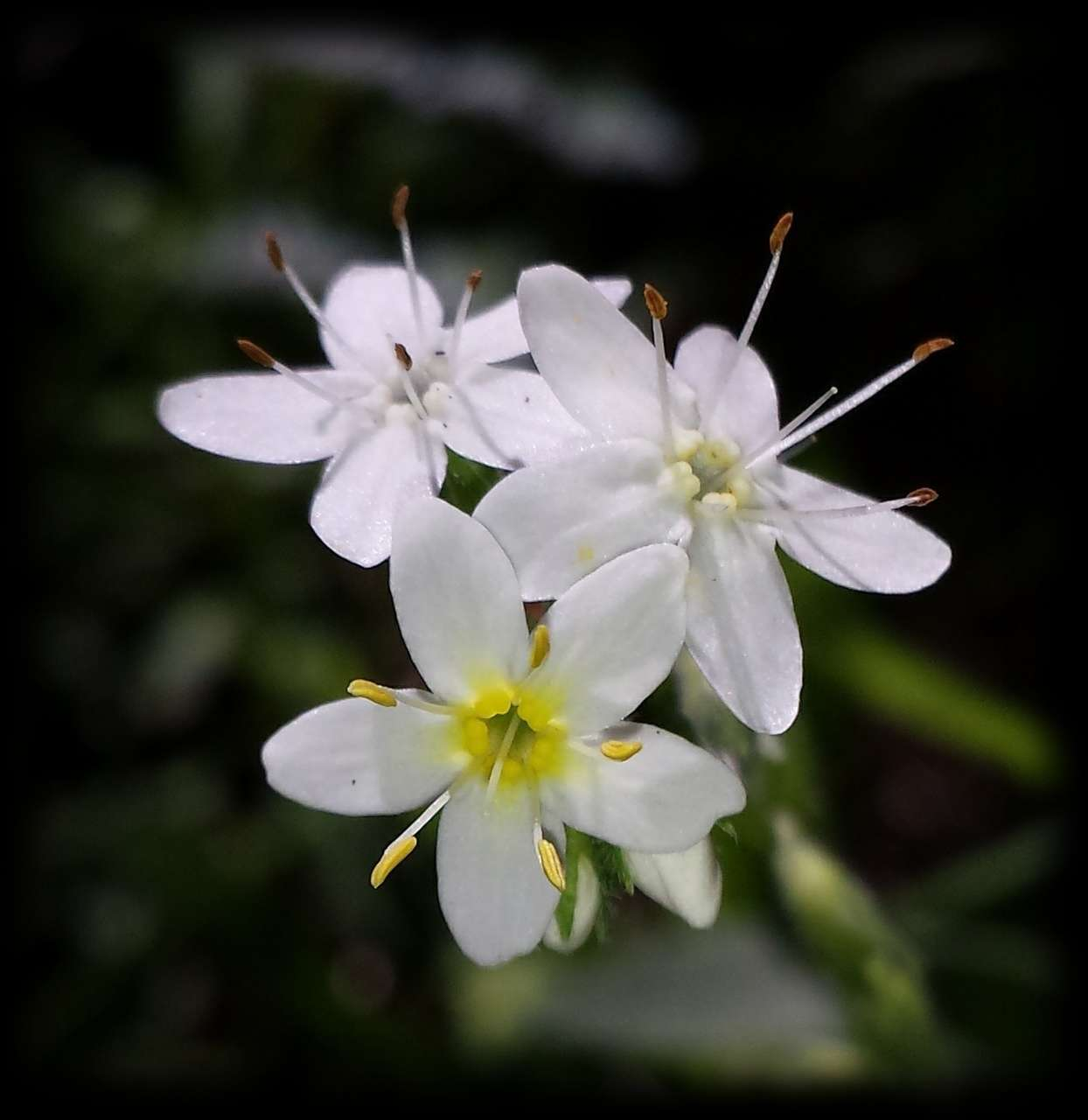

Conservation status
- Least Concern (IUCN 3.1)

Scientific classification
- Kingdom: Plantae
- Clade: Tracheophytes
- Clade: Angiosperms
- Clade: Eudicots
- Clade: Asterids
- Order: Boraginales
- Family: Boraginaceae
- Genus: Myosotis
- Species: M. exarrhena

Binomial name
- Myosotis exarrhena F.Muell

Synonyms
- Exarrhena suaveolens R.Br.

= Myosotis exarrhena =

Species of flowering plant

Myosotis exarrhena is a species of flowering plant in the family Boraginaceae, endemic to Australia. Robert Brown described this species as Exarrhena suaveolens in 1810. Plants of this species of forget-me-not are perennial rosettes with ebracteate inflorescences and white corollas with exserted stamens.

== Taxonomy and etymology ==
Myosotis exarrhena F.Muell. is in the plant family Boraginaceae. The species was originally described by Robert Brown in his Prodromus in 1810 as Exarrhena suaveolens R.Br. It was transferred to the genus Myosotis as M. suaveolens (R.Br.) Poir. in 1816, but this was an illegitimate name owing to M. suaveolens Waldst. & Kit. ex Willd., which was published in 1809 based on a European type. Ferdinand von Mueller finally made the valid combination M. exarrhena in 1889 in the updated Systematic Census of Australian Plants.

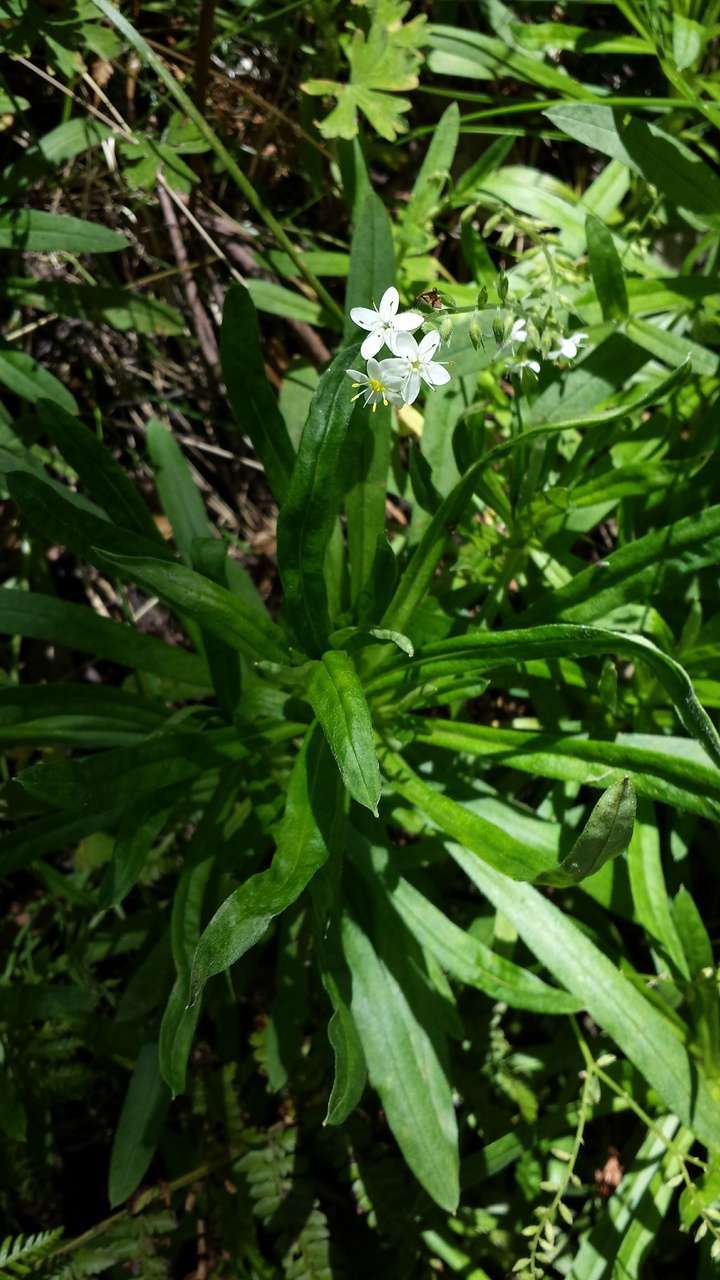
Habit and flowers of Myosotis exarrhena observed in Victoria, Australia

The lectotype (K001094009) and the isolectotype (K001094010) of Exarrhena suaveolens are on the same sheet at Kew Herbarium, and were designated by Peter G. Wilson & Jeannie Highet.

Myosotis exarrhena is one of two species native to Australia. Myosotis australis is native to Australia, as well as New Zealand and New Guinea. Myosotis exarrhena is morphologically more similar to other ebracteate-erect species from New Zealand, especially Myosotis concinna, than to M. australis. The Australian M. exarrhena can be distinguished from the New Zealand M. concinna by its white corollas, retrorse hairs on the underside of the rosette leaves and scape, and lack of hooked hairs on the calyx.

The species epithet exarrhena is based on the Greek word arrhen and refers to the exerted anthers.

== Phylogeny ==
One individual of Myosotis exarrhena was included in phylogenetic analyses of standard DNA sequencing markers (nuclear ribosomal DNA and chloroplast DNA regions).

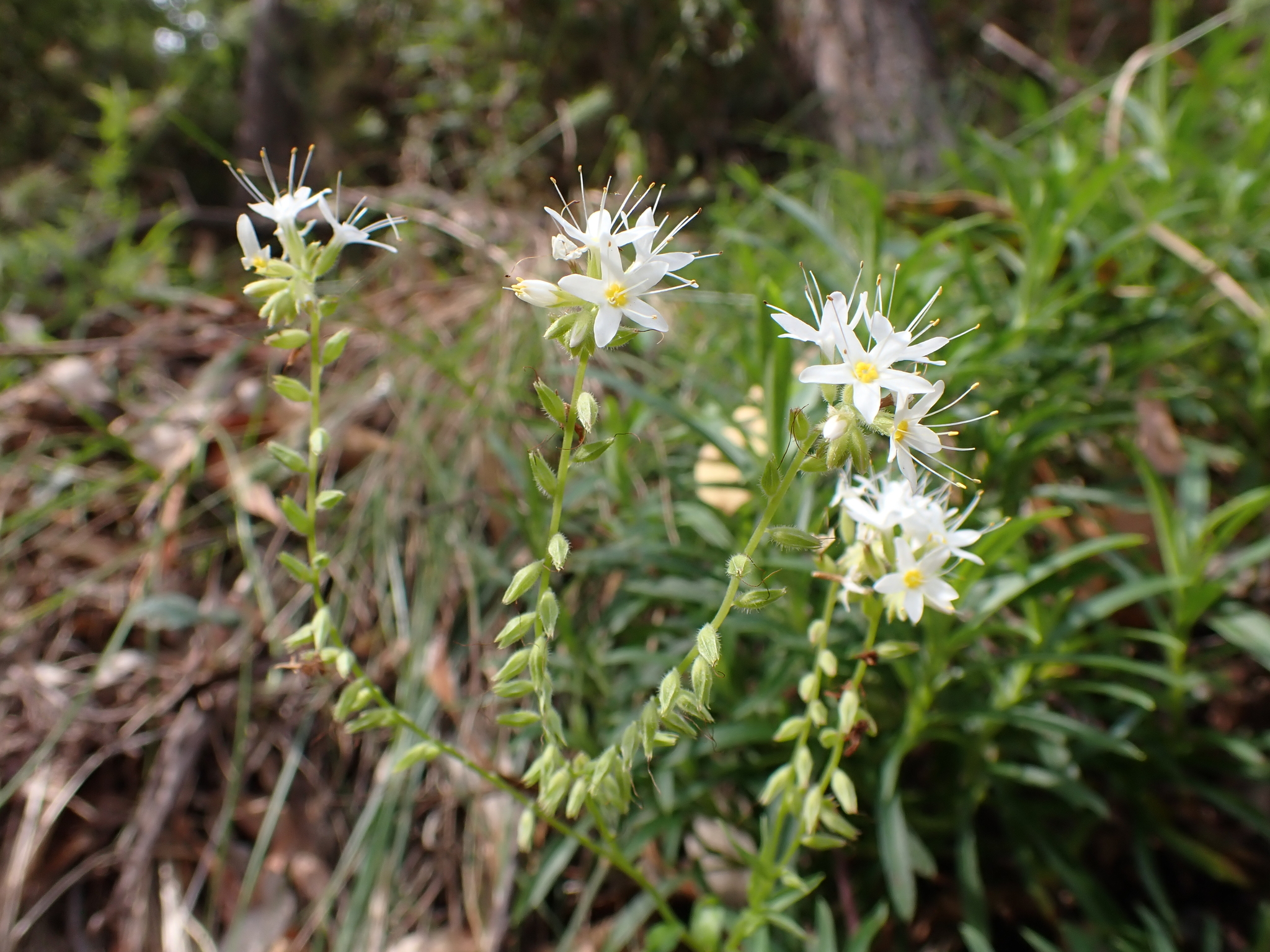
Inflorescences with flowers

Within the southern hemisphere lineage, species relationships were not well resolved. The individual of M. exarrhena grouped with Australian M. australis and several other mostly ebracteate-erect New Zealand Myosotis species.

== Description ==
Myosotis exarrhena plants are rosettes that are often stoloniferous. The rosette leaves have petioles that are 6–30 mm long. The rosette leaf blades are 7–55 mm long by 2–10 mm wide (length: width ratio 1.0–7.6: 1), lanceolate, oblanceolate or narrowly oblanceolate, widest below, at or above the middle, usually with an obtuse apex. Both surfaces of the leaf are uniformly and densely covered in flexuous to curved, usually appressed, antrorse (forward-facing) hairs that are oriented parallel to the midrib. Each rosette has multiple ascending, branched ebracteate inflorescences that are bifurcating at the top and up to 470 mm long. The cauline leaves are similar to the rosette leaves, but become smaller. The flowers are 36–91 per inflorescence and each is borne on a short pedicel without a bract. The calyx is 2–5 mm long at flowering and 3–6 mm long at fruiting, lobed to half to two-thirds of its length, and densely covered in straight to flexuous, often hooked, patent to erect, mostly antrorse hairs (with some retrorse or backward-facing hairs near the base). The corolla is white and 5–11 mm in diameter, with a cylindrical tube, petals that are usually narrowly ovate or ovate, and small yellow scales alternating with the petals. The anthers are fully exserted. The four smooth, shiny, usually medium to dark brown nutlets are 1.7–2.3 mm long by 1.0–1.5 mm wide and usually ovoid in shape.

The pollen of Myosotis exarrhena is of the exarrhena type.

The chromosome number of M. exarrhena is unknown.

Flowering and fruiting between October–March, with the main flowering period from December–February.

== Distribution and habitat ==
Myosotis exarrhena is endemic to Australia in the states of New South Wales, Australian Capital Territory, Victoria and Tasmania from 555 to 1000 m ASL, possibly up to 1370 m ASL, in forest, woodland, clearings or stream banks, on slopes, outcrops or banks.

== Conservation status ==
Myosotis exarrhena is not listed on the Australian Government's EPBC Act list of Threatened Flora. It is likely to be considered to be LC (Least Concern) according to the IUCN.

== Hybridisation ==
On the basis of morphological data, Myosotis exarrhena may hybridise with M. australis where the two species are known to co-occur in New South Wales, ACT and Victoria. Several specimens have been identified as interspecific M. exarrhena × M. australis hybrids.
