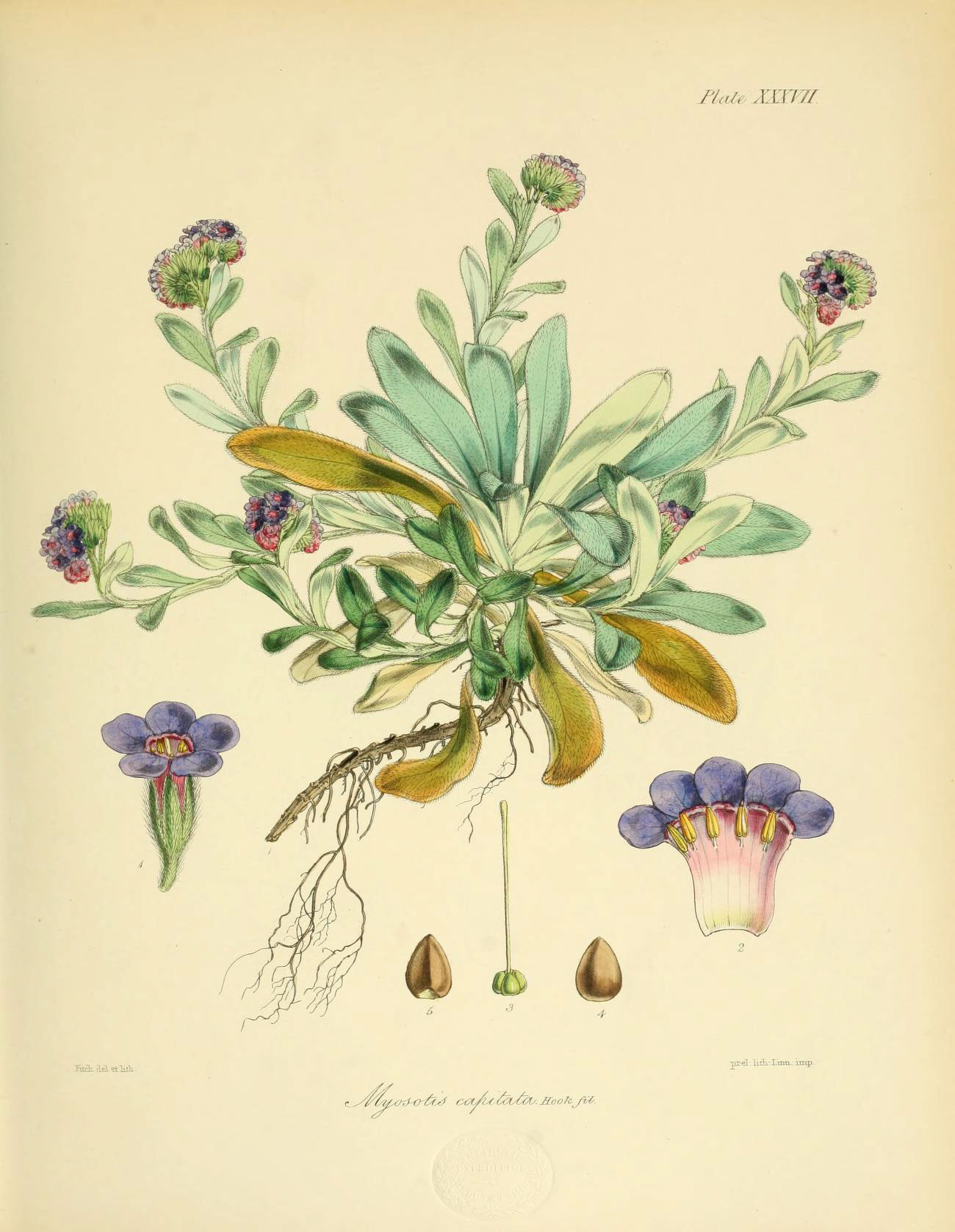
- Plate XXXVII of Hooker's Flora Antarctica

Conservation status
- Naturally Uncommon (NZ TCS)

Scientific classification
- Kingdom: Plantae
- Clade: Tracheophytes
- Clade: Angiosperms
- Clade: Eudicots
- Clade: Asterids
- Order: Boraginales
- Family: Boraginaceae
- Genus: Myosotis
- Species: M. capitata

Binomial name
- Myosotis capitata Hook.f.

= Myosotis capitata =

Species of flowering plant

Myosotis capitata is a species of flowering plant in the family Boraginaceae, endemic to the Campbell and Auckland Islands of New Zealand. Joseph Dalton Hooker described the species in his 19th century work Flora Antarctica. Plants of this species of forget-me-not are perennial and erect, and have ebracteate inflorescences and blue corollas. It is one of two native species of Myosotis in the New Zealand subantarctic islands, the other being M. antarctica, which can also have blue corollas.

== Taxonomy and etymology ==
Myosotis capitata Hook.f. is in the plant family Boraginaceae and was described in 1844 by Joseph Dalton Hooker. After its description, Hooker expanded the circumscription of M. capitata to include plants from Rakiura / Stewart Island, New Zealand. Joseph Beattie Armstrong described a new variety, M. capitata var. albiflora J.B.Armstr., for the Stewart Island plants and other similar fleshy, white-flowered plants from southern South Island, New Zealand, for which the name M. rakiura L.B.Moore is now used. Myosotis capitata can be distinguished from M. rakiura in its blue corollas, lack of retrorse trichomes anywhere on the plant, including the underside of the leaves, and partially exserted anthers. The type specimen of Myosotis capitata is lodged at Kew Herbarium.

The specific epithet, capitata, derives from the Latin, caput/capitis, meaning "head" and hence describes the plant as having its flowers arranged in tightly compacted, head-like inflorescences.

== Phylogeny ==
Myosotis capitata was shown to be a part of the monophyletic southern hemisphere lineage of Myosotis in phylogenetic analyses of standard DNA sequencing markers (nuclear ribosomal DNA and chloroplast DNA regions). Within the southern hemisphere lineage, species relationships were not well resolved. The sequences of M. capitata are not that similar to the other native subantarctic species, M. antarctica, and the sole individual of M. capitata sampled formed a unique lineage in the chloroplast DNA network.

A 2025 phylogenomic study based on DNA from whole plastids, target capture of universal angiosperm bait markers, and the full nuclear ribosomal DNA cistron, included four individuals identified a priori of M. capitata from Auckland Island. The species was monophyletic with high support in all three data sets, and sister to the one of the four Campbell Island individuals identified a priori as M. antarctica, which was shown in this study to be a misidentified individual of M. capitata. These five individuals of M. capitata were in turn closely related to M. exarrhena and M. australis from Australia in the target-capture and plastid data sets.

== Description ==
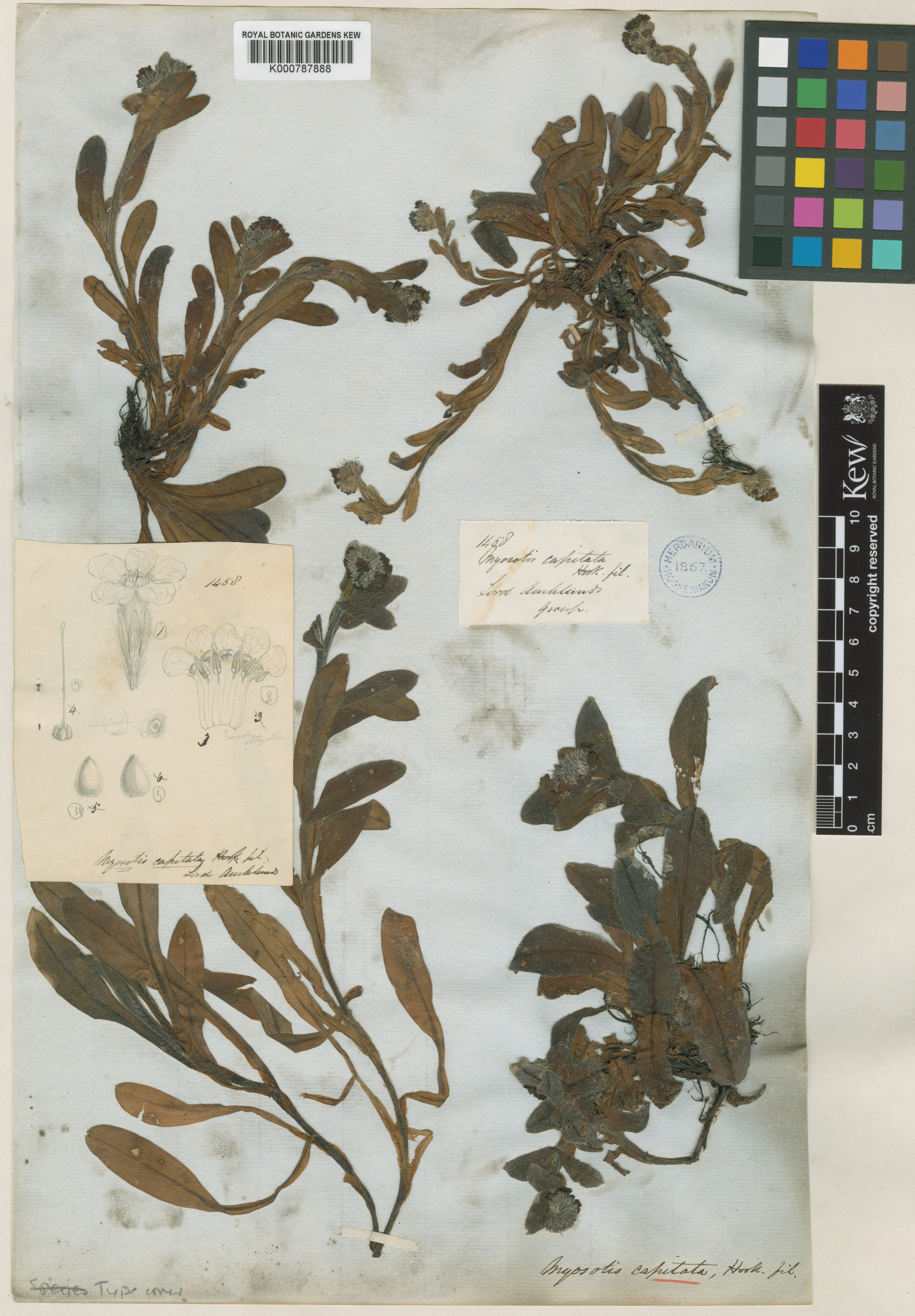
Type specimen of Myosotis capitata collected at "Lord Auckland's group" (Auckland Islands) likely by Joseph Dalton Hooker during the Ross expedition.

Myosotis capitata plants are small rosettes that may cluster together into tufts or loose clumps. The rosette leaves have petioles 8–25 mm long. The rosette leaf blades are 13–48 mm long by 4–19 mm wide (length: width ratio 1.5–4.2: 1), elliptic, oblanceolate or narrowly obovate, widest at or above the middle, with an obtuse apex. The upper surface of the leaf is densely covered in long silky forward-facing hairs, while on the lower surface the hairs are shorter, fewer and also forward-facing. Each rosette has 2–7 ascending to erect, branched, ebracteate inflorescences that are up to 37 cm long. The cauline leaves on the lower part of the inflorescence are similar to the rosette leaves, and decrease in size toward the tip. There can be up to 150 flowers condensed near the top of each inflorescence. Although the flowers are borne on short pedicels, they do not have bracts. The calyx is 2–4 mm long at flowering and 4–6 mm long at fruiting, lobed to half or more of its length, and densely covered in long, forward-facing silky hairs. The corolla is deep blue, up to 10 mm in diameter, with a cylindrical tube, petals that are rounded and flat, and small yellow scales alternating with the petals. The anthers are partly exserted, with the tips only surpassing the scales. The four smooth, shiny, black nutlets are 1.4–2.1 mm long by 1.0–1.7 mm wide and ovoid in shape.

Myosotis capitata has M. brockiei or M. australis type pollen.

The chromosome number of M. capitata is 2n = 46.

It flowers and fruits from November to February.

== Distribution and habitat ==
Myosotis capitata is a forget-me-not endemic to the Auckland Islands and Campbell Island, New Zealand. On the Auckland Islands, it has been collected on Auckland Island, Adams Island and Ewing Island. It is found from sea level up to altitudes of 630m, on the shore edge, rocks, bluffs or cliffs in exposed fellfield or banks with sparse vegetation.

== Conservation status ==
The species is listed as "At Risk - Naturally Uncommon" on the most recent assessment (2023) under the New Zealand Threatened Classification system for plants, as well as the qualifier "RR" (Range Restricted) because of its range which is restricted to certain subantarctic islands. This status was unchanged from the 2017 assessment.

== Gallery ==
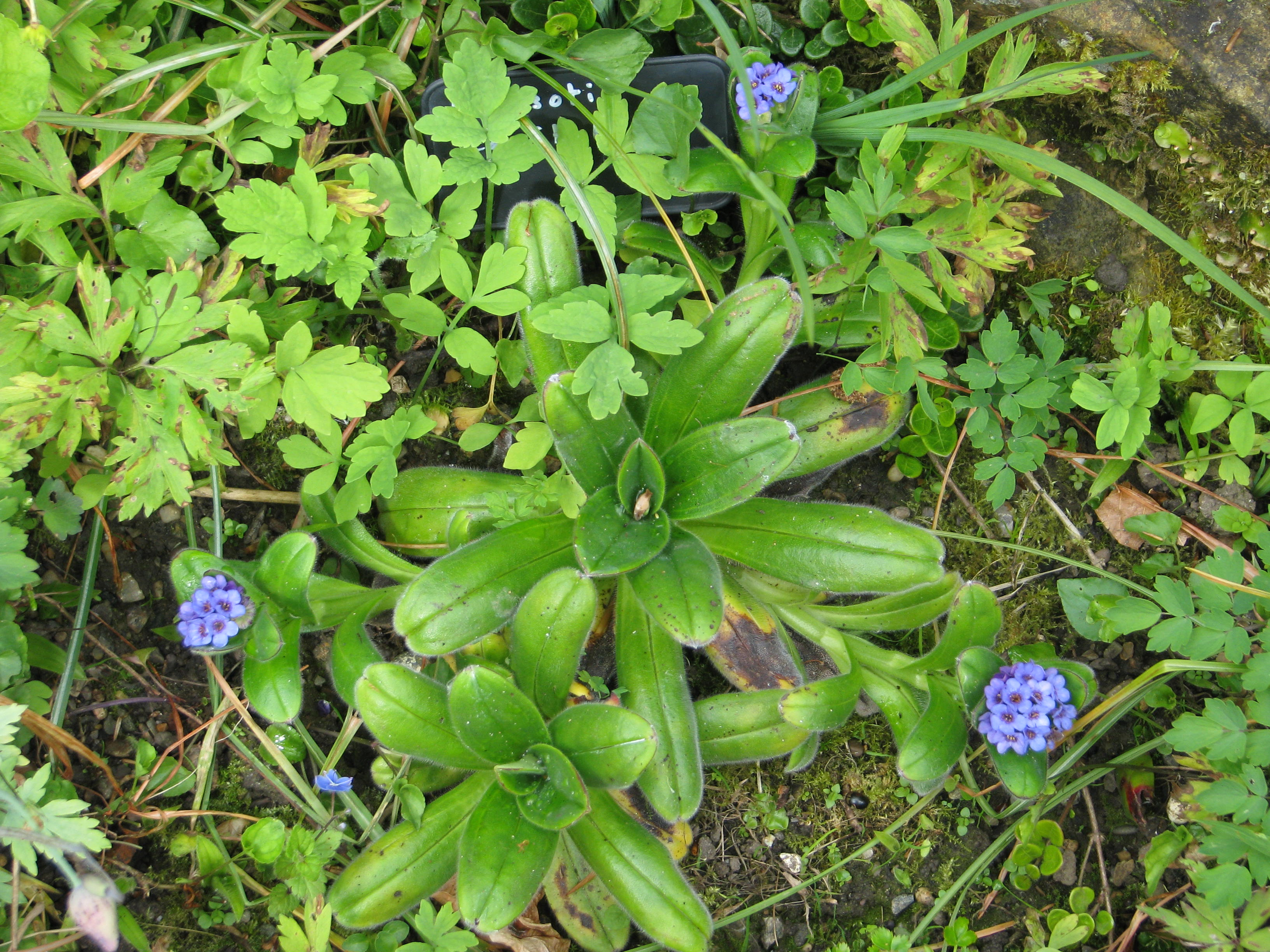
Flowering plant

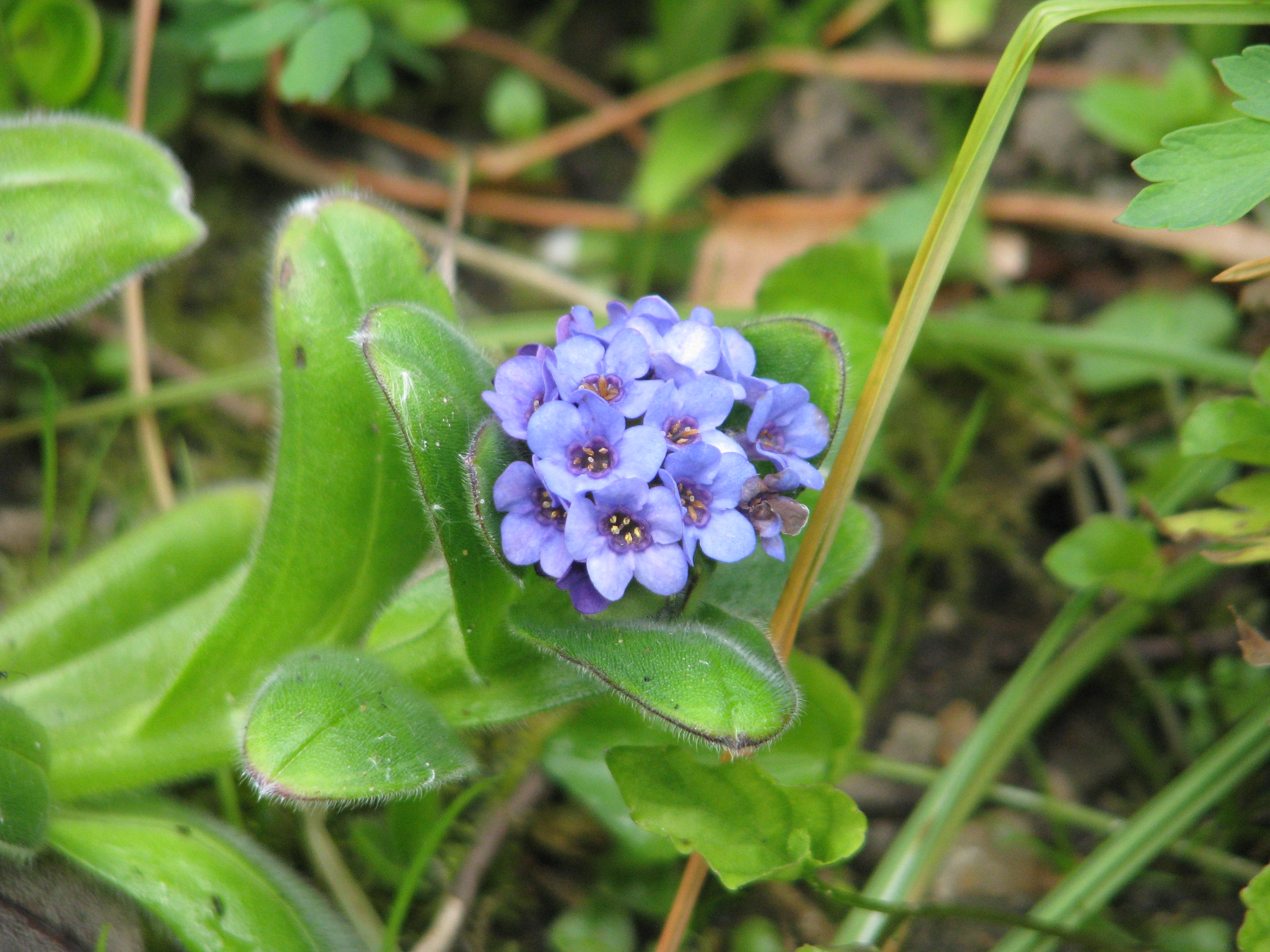
Close up of inflorescence

Inflorescence from the side

Close up of hairs on underside of cauline leaf

Auckland Island habitat
