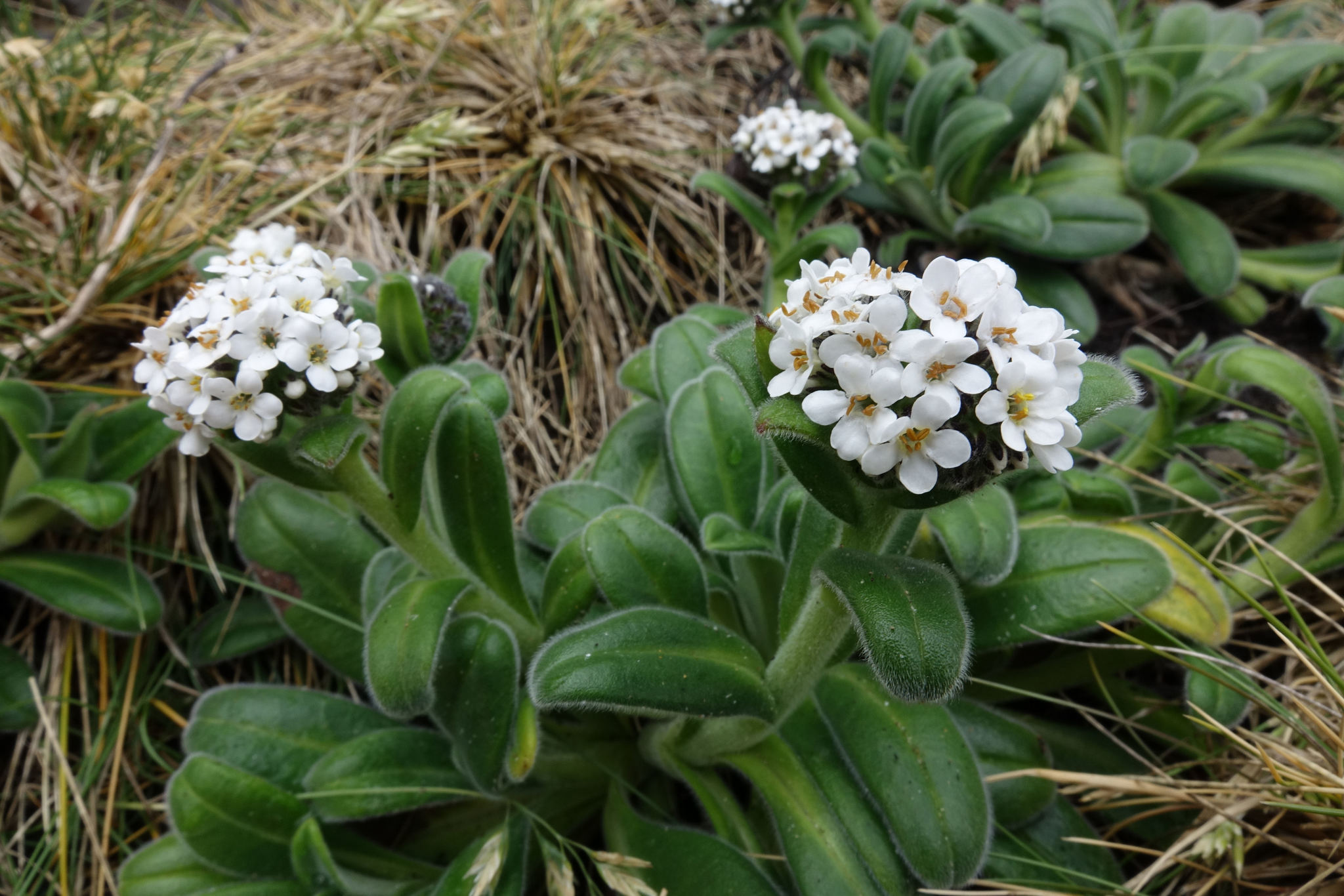
- Myosotis rakiura in flower

Conservation status
- Naturally Uncommon (NZ TCS)

Scientific classification
- Kingdom: Plantae
- Clade: Tracheophytes
- Clade: Angiosperms
- Clade: Eudicots
- Clade: Asterids
- Order: Boraginales
- Family: Boraginaceae
- Genus: Myosotis
- Species: M. rakiura

Binomial name
- Myosotis rakiura L.B.Moore

Synonyms
- Myosotis albida (Kirk) Cheeseman ex Cockayne

= Myosotis rakiura =

Species of flowering plant

Myosotis rakiura is a species of flowering plant in the family Boraginaceae, endemic to southern South Island and Stewart Island / Rakiura of New Zealand. Joseph Beattie Armstrong described the species in 1881. Plants of this species of forget-me-not are perennial rosettes which form loose tufts or clumps, with ebracteate, erect inflorescences, and white corollas with exserted stamens.

== Taxonomy and etymology ==
Myosotis rakiura is in the plant family Boraginaceae and was described as M. capitata var. albiflora in 1881 by Joseph Beattie Armstrong . Lucy Moore gave it a new name, M. rakiura, when she recognized it at the species level, because M. albiflora Banks & Sol. ex Hook.f. was already validly published for a southern South American species.

Myosotis rakiura is morphologically similar to other ebracteate-erect species, especially the New Zealand subantarctic island endemic species, M. capitata. Myosotis rakiura can be distinguished from M. capitata by the following characters: white corollas, the presence of retrorse trichomes on many plant parts (e.g. the underside of the rosette leaves), and fully exserted anthers.

The lectotype specimen of Myosotis rakiura was collected from Stewart Island/Rakiura by James West Stack and is lodged at Manaaki Whenua - Landcare Research Allan Herbarium (CHR 635645), where there is also an isolectotype (CHR 635646).

The specific epithet, rakiura, is derived from the Ngāi Tahu name in te reo Māori for Stewart Island (Rakiura), which can be translated as ‘glowing sky’.

== Phylogeny ==
Myosotis rakiura was shown to be a part of the monophyletic southern hemisphere lineage of Myosotis in phylogenetic analyses of standard DNA sequencing markers (nuclear ribosomal DNA and chloroplast DNA regions). Within the southern hemisphere lineage, species relationships were not well resolved. The two sequenced individuals of M. rakiura grouped with a mixture of bracteate-prostrate and ebracteate-erect species in different analyses.

== Description ==
Myosotis rakiura plants are single rosettes that often grow together to form loose tufts or clumps. The rosette leaves have petioles 5–40 mm long. The rosette leaf blades are 19–62 mm long by 7–21 mm wide (length: width ratio 2.0–5.3: 1), oblanceolate or sometimes narrowly ovate, widest at or above the middle (rarely below the middle), with an obtuse apex. The upper surface is densely covered in mostly flexuous, patent to erect, antrorse (forward-facing) hairs that are oriented oblique to the mid vein. The hairs on the edges of the leaf are similar but mostly erect, and the hairs on the underside of the leaf are also similar but mostly retrorse (backward-facing) and appressed to patent. Each rosette has 1–10 erect, once- or twice-branched, ebracteate inflorescences that are up to 300 mm long and are bifurcating in a forked 'V' shape near the tips. The cauline leaves are similar to the rosette leaves but smaller with shorter petioles, and decrease in size toward the tip. Each inflorescence has up to 210 flowers, each borne on a pedicel up to 4 mm long at fruiting, and each without a bract. The calyx is 3–5 mm long at flowering and 3–7 mm long at fruiting, lobed to half to three-quarters of its length, and densely covered in mostly antrorse (some retrorse near the base), patent to erect, mostly flexuous hairs. The corolla is white, up to 9 mm in diameter, with a cylindrical tube, petals that are obovate, broadly obovate or very broadly obovate, and small yellow scales alternating with the petals. The anthers are fully exserted above the scales. The four smooth, shiny, medium to dark brown nutlets are 1.5–2.0 mm long by 0.9–1.4 mm wide and ovoid in shape.

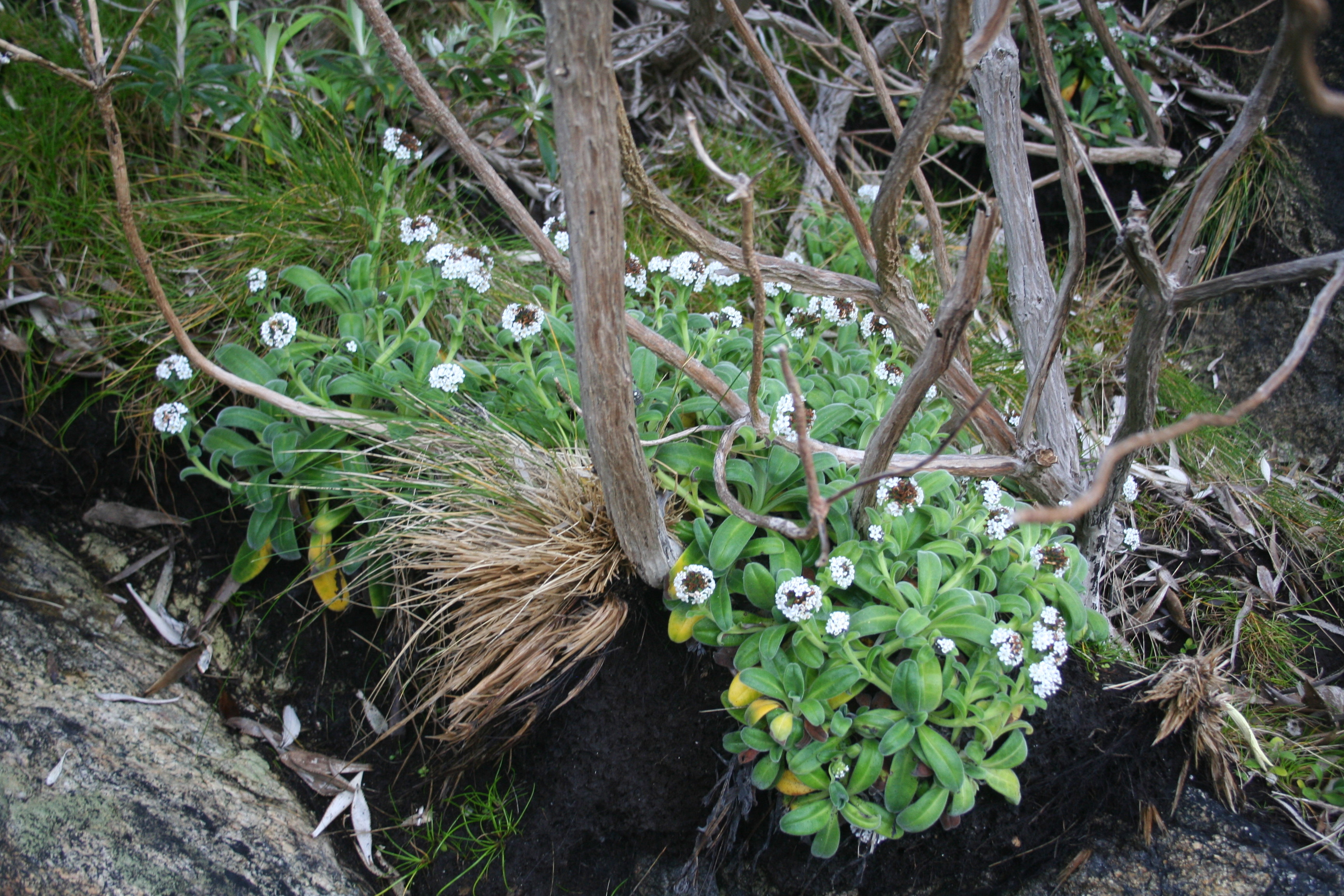
Flowering plants in coastal habitat on Stewart Island

The chromosome number of M. rakiura is unknown.

The pollen of M. rakiura is unknown.

It flowers from November–February and fruits from July–April., with the main flowering and fruiting period from December–January, fruiting July–April.

== Distribution and habitat ==
Myosotis rakiura is a forget-me-not endemic to coastal southern New Zealand, specifically Otago and Southland (South Island), Stewart Island/Rakiura, and Solander Island/Hautere from 0–130 m ASL. It is found on coastal cliffs and rocks, in shrubland, turf or grassland.

== Conservation status ==
The species is listed as At Risk - Naturally Uncommon on the most recent assessment (2017–2018) under the New Zealand Threatened Classification system for plants, with the qualifiers "Sp" (Sparse) and "RR" (Range Restricted).

== Gallery ==
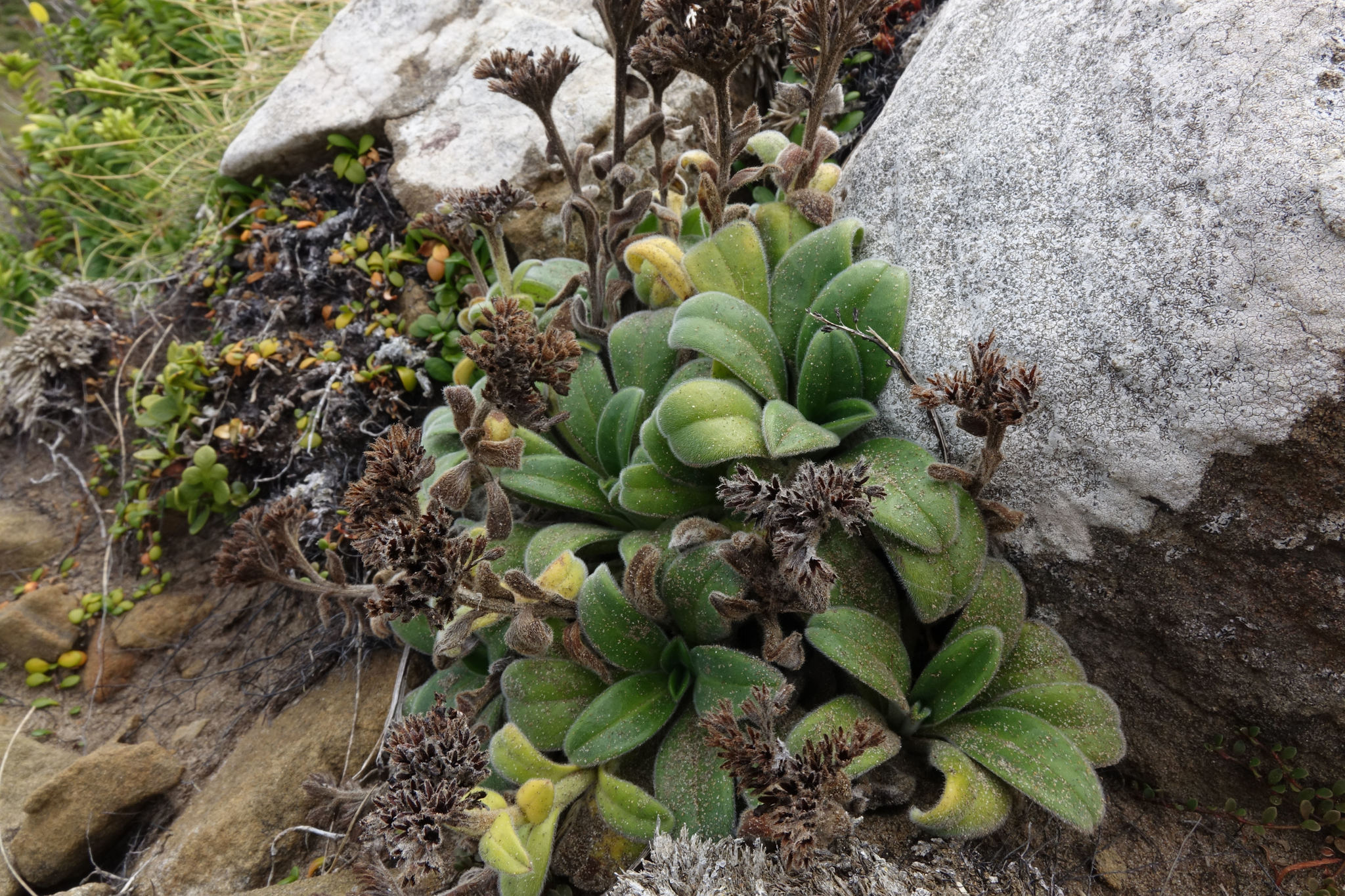
Plants in fruit

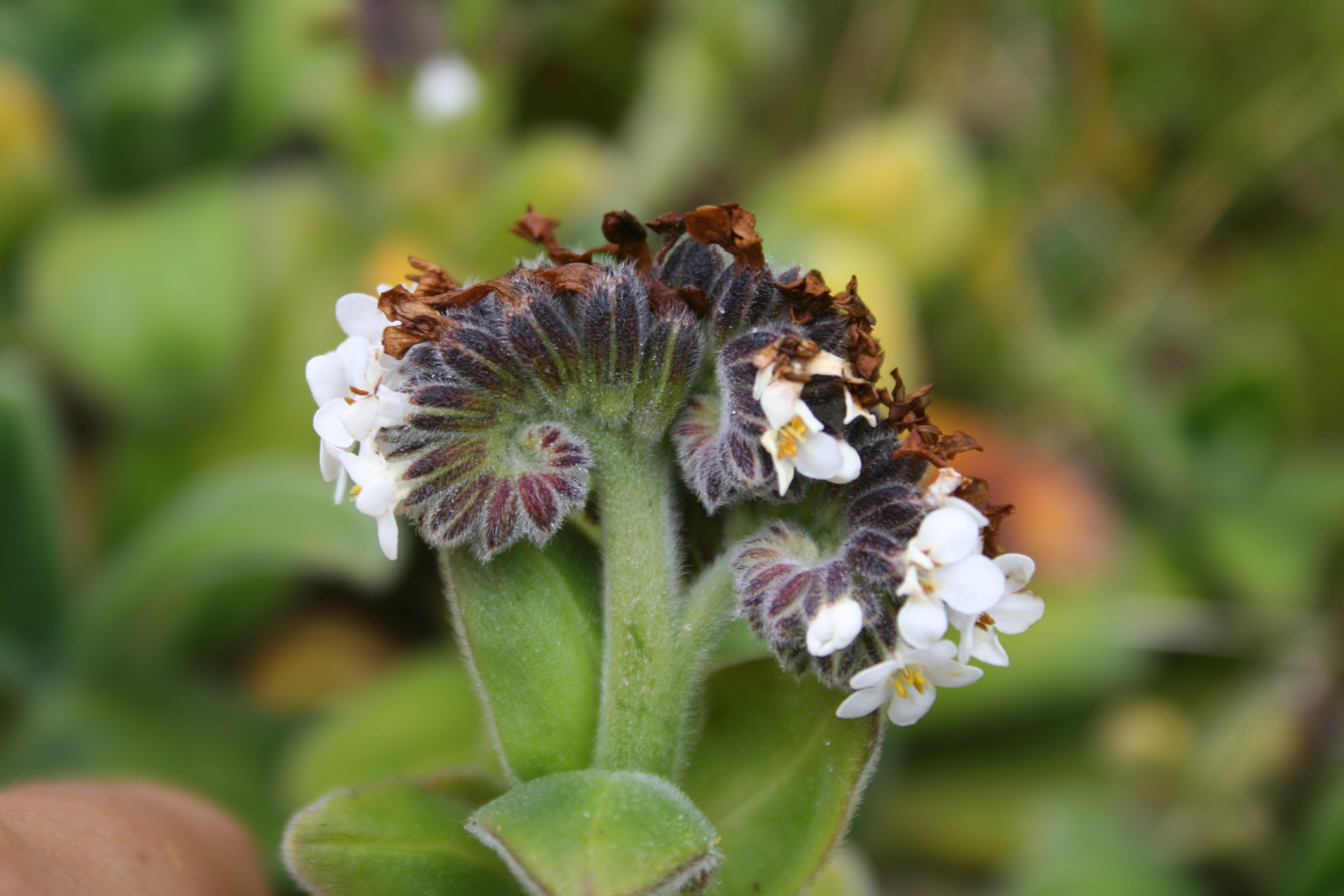
Side view of an inflorescence

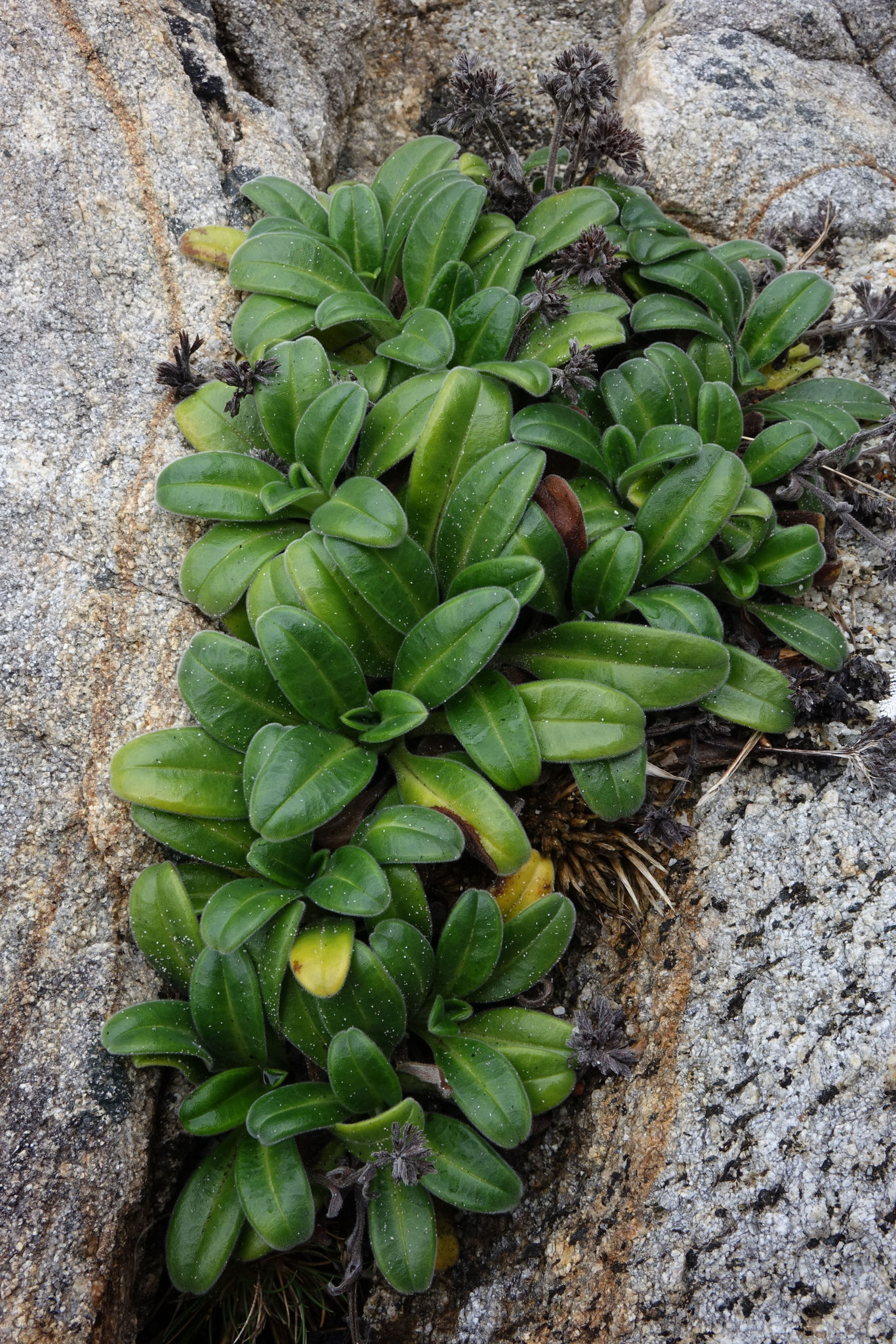
Rosette leaves

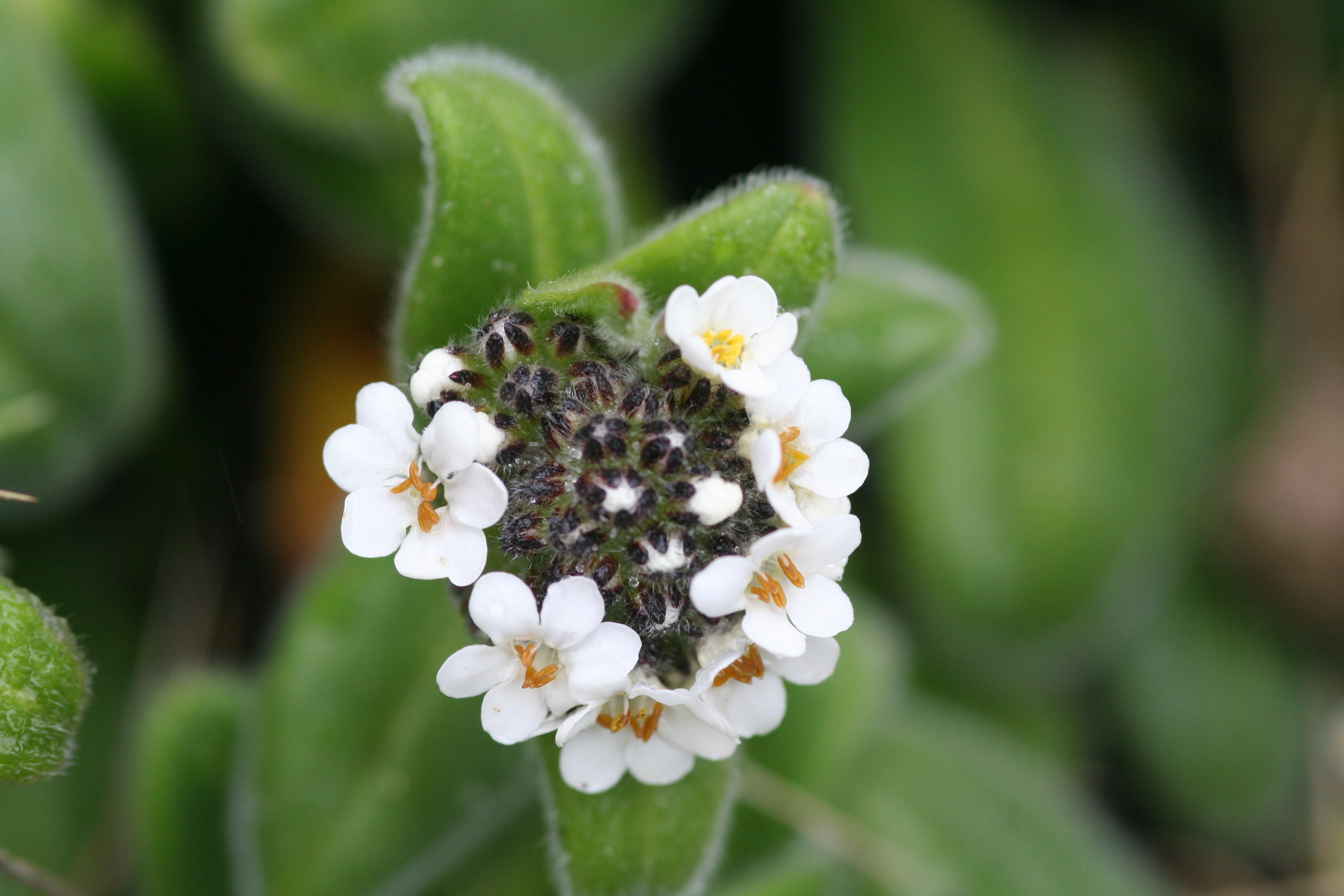
Top view of an inflorescence, with close-up of flowers
